= Battle of Caen (1346) =

Battle during the Hundred Years' War

- Part of the Crécy campaign during the Hundred Years' War
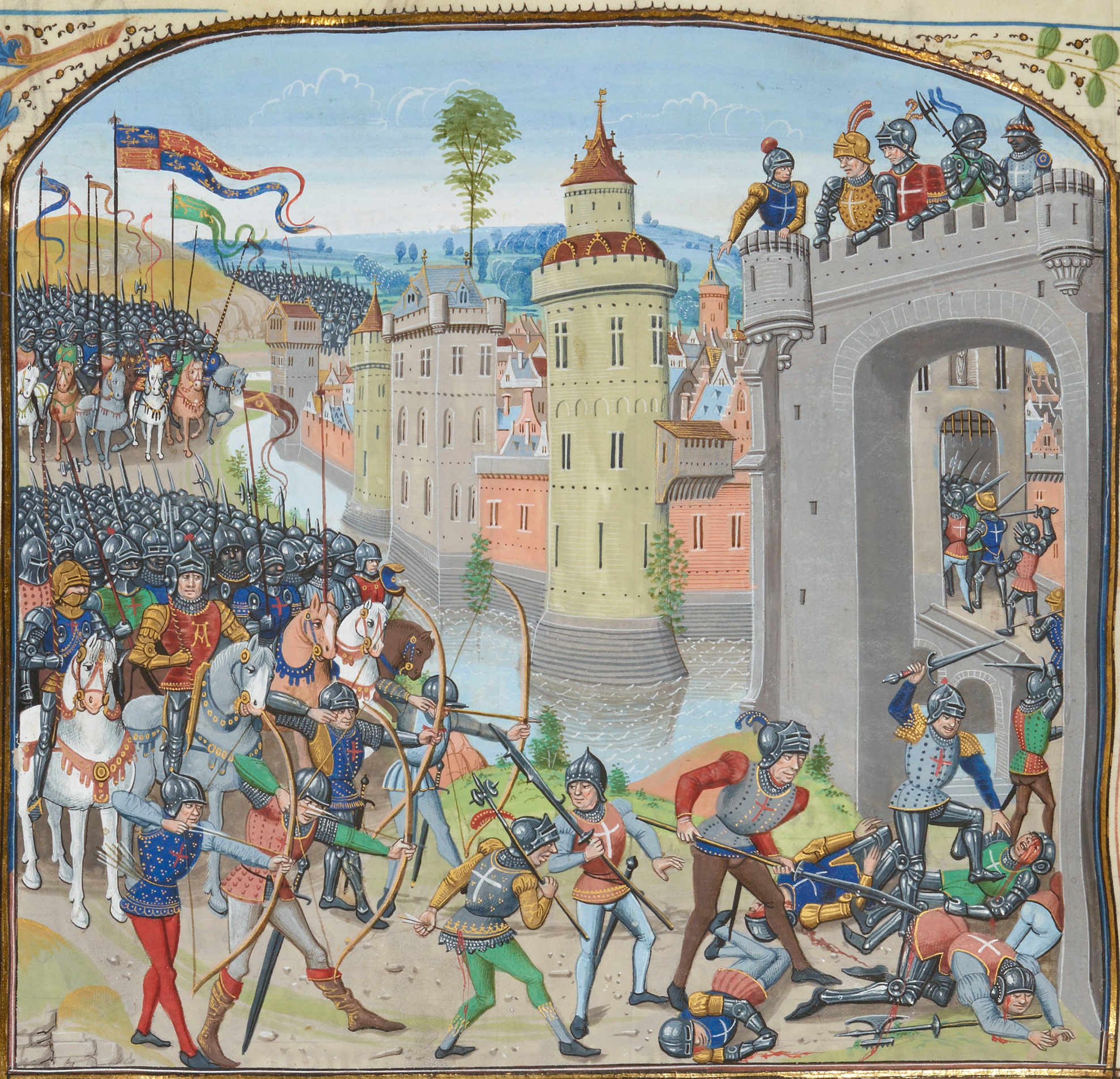
- The storming of Caen, depicted in a manuscript of Froissart's Chronicles
Date	26 July 1346
Location	Caen, Normandy, France 49°11′N 0°22′W
Result	English victory

Belligerents
Kingdom of England	Kingdom of France

Commanders and leaders
King Edward III Edward the Black Prince	Raoul, Count of Eu (POW)

Strength
12,000 (not all engaged)	1,500 soldiers

Casualties and losses
Unknown, but light	c. 5,000 soldiers and civilians
- Location of the battle on a map of modern France

The Battle of Caen was an assault conducted on 26 July 1346 by forces from the Kingdom of England, led by King Edward III, on the French-held town of Caen and Normandy as a part of the Hundred Years' War.

The assault was part of the Chevauchée of Edward III, which had started a month earlier when the English landed in Normandy. The French failed to intercept the English transports at sea and were taken by surprise, with their main army of more than 15,000 men in Gascony. The English were virtually unopposed and devastated much of Normandy before assaulting Caen. Part of the English army, which consisted of 12,000–15,000, commanded by the Earls of Warwick and Northampton, prematurely attacked Caen. It was garrisoned by 1,000–1,500 soldiers, who were supplemented by an unknown, large number of armed townsmen, and commanded by Raoul, the Count of Eu, the Grand Constable of France. The town was captured in the first assault. More than 5,000 of the ordinary soldiers and townspeople were killed, and a few nobles were taken prisoner. The town was sacked for five days.

Five days after storming the city the English marched to the River Seine. By 12 August they were 20 miles (32 kilometres) from Paris. After turning north they heavily defeated the French at the Battle of Crécy on 26 August. Subsequently, the English commenced the successful siege of Calais, which had a significant effect on the remainder of the war.

== Background ==
Since the Norman Conquest of England in 1066, English monarchs had held titles and lands within France, the possession of which made them vassals of the kings of France. The status of the English king's French fiefs was a major source of conflict between the two monarchies throughout the Middle Ages. Following a series of disagreements between Philip VI of France (r. 1328–1350) and Edward III of England (r. 1327–1377), on 24 May 1337 Philip's Great Council in Paris agreed that the Duchy of Aquitaine, effectively Gascony, should be taken back into Philip's hands on the ground that Edward was in breach of his obligations as a vassal. This marked the start of the Hundred Years' War, which was to last 116 years.

Although Gascony was the cause of the war, Edward was able to spare few resources for it and when an English army had campaigned on the continent it had operated in northern France. Edward determined early in 1345 to attack France on three fronts: a small force would sail for Brittany; a slightly larger force would proceed to Gascony under the command of Henry, Earl of Derby; and the main force would accompany Edward to northern France or Flanders. In early 1345 the French decided to stand on the defensive in the south west. Their intelligence had uncovered the English plan for offensives in the three theatres, but they did not have the money to raise a significant army in each. They anticipated, correctly, that the English planned to make their main effort in northern France. Thus they directed what resources they had to there, planning to assemble their main army at Arras on 22 July. Southwestern France was encouraged to rely on its own resources.

Edward III's main army sailed on 29 June 1345. It anchored off Sluys in Flanders until 22 July, while Edward attended to diplomatic affairs. When the fleet sailed again, probably intending to land in Normandy, it was scattered by a storm and the ships found their way to several English ports over the following week. After more than five weeks on board ship, the men and horses had to be disembarked. There was a further week's delay while the King and his council debated what to do, by which time it proved impossible to take any action with the main English army before winter. Aware of this, Philip VI despatched reinforcements to Brittany and Gascony. During 1345, Derby led a whirlwind campaign through Gascony at the head of an Anglo-Gascon army. He smashed two large French armies at the battles of Bergerac and Auberoche, captured more than a hundred French towns and fortifications in Périgord and Agenais and gave the English possessions in Gascony strategic depth. Late in the year he captured the strategically and logistically important town of Aiguillon, "the key to Gascony".

== Prelude ==
John, Duke of Normandy, the son and heir of Philip VI, was placed in charge of all French forces in south west France, as he had been the previous autumn. In March 1346 a French army numbering between 15,000 and 20,000, enormously superior to any force the Anglo-Gascons could field, marched on Aiguillon and besieged it on 1 April. On 2 April the arrière-ban, the formal call to arms for all able-bodied males, was announced for the south of France. French financial, logistical and manpower efforts were focused on this offensive.

The French were aware of Edward III's efforts, but given the extreme difficulty of disembarking an army other than at a port, and the recent ambivalence of Edward's erstwhile allies in Flanders, the French assumed that Edward would sail for one of the friendly ports of Brittany or Gascony—probably the latter, to relieve Aiguillon. To guard against any possibility of an English landing in northern France, Philip VI relied on his powerful navy. This reliance was misplaced given the naval technology of the time and the French were unable to prevent Edward III successfully crossing the Channel.

Map of the route of Edward III's chevauchée of 1346

The campaign began on 11 July 1346 when Edward's fleet of more than 700 vessels, the largest ever assembled by the English to that date, departed the south of England and landed the next day at St. Vaast la Hogue, 20 miles (32 kilometres) from Cherbourg. The English army was estimated to be between 12,000 and 15,000 strong and consisted of English and Welsh soldiers as well as some German and Breton mercenaries and allies. It included several Norman barons who were unhappy with the rule of Philip VI. The English achieved complete strategic surprise and marched south. Edward's aim was to conduct a chevauchée, a large-scale raid, across French territory to reduce his opponent's morale and wealth. His soldiers razed every town in their path and looted whatever they could from the populace. The towns of Carentan, Saint-Lô and Torteval were destroyed as the army passed, along with many smaller places. The English fleet paralleled the army's route, devastating the country for up to 5 miles (8 kilometres) inland and taking vast amounts of loot; many ships deserted, their crews having filled their holds. They also captured or burnt more than a hundred ships; 61 of these had been converted into military vessels. Caen, the cultural, political, religious and financial centre of north west Normandy, was Edward's initial target; he hoped to recoup his expenditure on the expedition and put pressure on the French government by taking this important city and destroying it.

== Battle ==
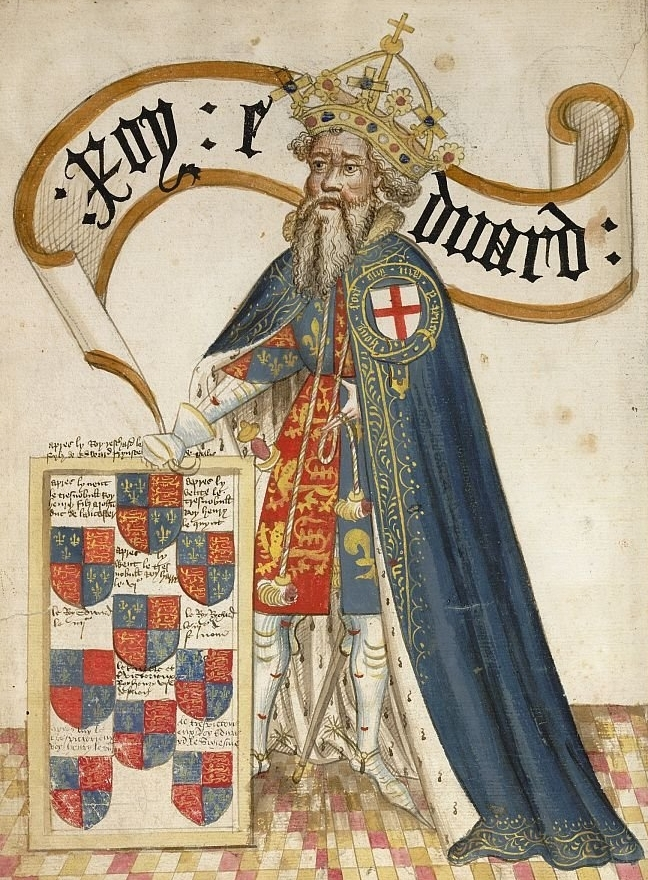
Edward III

Caen was an old city on the north bank of the River Orne. At this time it was larger than any English town other than London. A branch of the River Odon split the town into two parts: the old town and the new town. The old part was a walled city with a very strong castle, but was vulnerable to an English attack at places where the walls had crumbled, in spite of last-minute repairs and improvisations. The new part of the city, the Ile Saint-Jean, was a wealthy district of merchants and landowners who lived on the island formed between the Orne and the Odon. This district was more easily defended, as its perimeter was formed by the rivers and was connected only by three fortified bridges to the neighbouring banks. However, it was often possible, especially in summer, to ford parts of the rivers. The Caen area also featured two large fortified abbeys, one on each side of the city, which could be used to form bastions against an attacking force. Caen was garrisoned by 1,000–1,500 soldiers, a large proportion of whom were professional crossbowmen, and an unknown but large number of armed townsmen. They were commanded by Raoul, the Count of Eu, who was the Grand Constable of France, the senior figure in the French military hierarchy.

On 25 July an English emissary offered the town council surrender terms: the lives and property of the populace would be spared if the town and castle were given up. These were summarily rejected and the emissary imprisoned. The English army arrived outside the walls early on 26 July and immediately seized the undefended abbeys, before forming up for a planned attack on the old town. Edward intended to waste no time on siege preparations as his army possessed no siege engines. Raoul of Eu had originally planned to defend the old town and the castle, but pressure from wealthy citizens persuaded him to shift the defence to the Ile Saint-Jean once the English had arrived. This hasty withdrawal proved disastrous, as important precautions, vital for the area's defence, were overlooked in the hurried relocation of the defenders.

Discovering that the old town was undefended, the English promptly seized it. A small force was dispatched to blockade the castle in the north of the town, which was garrisoned by 300 soldiers under the command of Guillaume Bertrand, Bishop of Bayeux. Edward changed his axis of advance and prepared to attack the defended bridges from the north bank of the Odon. As they manoeuvred into position, the English archers and men-at-arms, eager for plunder, pre-empted his orders and rushed the bridges before the assault force was fully in place. The attack was nominally led by the Earls of Warwick and Northampton and Richard Talbot, although they had very little control over the troops supposedly under their command. When Edward saw the assault developing before he was ready, he ordered a retreat but this was ignored by his men.

As hundreds of English soldiers flung themselves across the bridges and into a furious mêlée on the far side, a large part of the French garrison was drawn in. The river was low after a period of dry weather and English longbowmen and Welsh spearmen waded across, harassed by crossbow fire, and stormed the improvised defences along the riverbank. The French force was stretched too thin for an effective defence and was penetrated at several points. This allowed the English to enter the new town and attack the defenders of the bridge from the rear, prompting a collapse of the defence. Several of the most senior French officers took to their horses and cut their way through the English to the safety of the castle, while a few others barricaded themselves in the tower overlooking the bridge. The common soldiers among the fleeing French were cut down, as was normal at the time; only a handful of the wealthier combatants and townsfolk were taken prisoner, among whom was the Count of Eu.

== Aftermath ==
The victorious English began a furious sack of the town, burning most of it to the ground, seizing thousands of livres (pounds) worth of valuables as well as killing approximately half the town's population; the remainder fled into the countryside, pursued by cavalry. There was also an orgy of drunken rape; English knights are recorded as having saved some young women, either from being raped, or from being killed afterwards. At least 2,500 French bodies were later buried in mass graves outside the town, and total fatalities are said to have been over 5,000. English casualties were not recorded other than that one man-at-arms was killed, although losses amongst the enlisted archers and spearmen may have been heavy.

The sack of the city continued for five days, during which Edward attempted and failed to capture the castle, and paid homage at the grave of his ancestor William the Conqueror, who was buried in the town. Among the captives were several senior French noblemen, who were held prisoner for several years before being ransomed by their English captors. They included the Count of Eu, who would remain a prisoner in England until 1350; when he returned to France, he was summarily executed on the orders of the French king. The English discovered a proclamation from Philip instructing Norman raiding parties to despoil the south coast of England, which was used by English recruiting parties for several years to stir up anti-French feeling.

The English army moved off on 1 August, southwards to the River Seine and then towards Paris. By 12 August they were 20 miles (32 km) from Paris. They then turned north, and a month after the capture of Caen the English won the Battle of Blanchetaque, as they fought their way across the Somme. On 28 August the main French army under Philip VI was crushingly defeated at the Battle of Crécy with heavy loss of life. Edward III ended the campaign by laying siege to Calais, which fell after twelve months, securing an English entrepôt into northern France which was held for two hundred years.

== Citations and sources ==
=== Sources ===
- Allmand, Christopher (2005). The Hundred Years War: England and France at War c. 1300 – c. 1450. Cambridge: Cambridge University Press. ISBN 978-0521319232.
- Burne, Alfred (1999) [1955]. The Crecy War. Ware, Hertfordshire: Wordsworth Editions. ISBN 978-1840222104.
- Crowcroft, Robert & Cannon, John (2015). "Gascony". The Oxford Companion to British History. Oxford: Oxford University Press. p. 389. ISBN 978-0199677832.
- DeVries, Kelly (2006). Infantry Warfare in the Early Fourteenth Century: Discipline, Tactics, and Technology. Woodbridge, Suffolk; Rochester, NY: Boydell Press. ISBN 978-0851155715.
- Fowler, Kenneth (1961). Henry of Grosmont, First Duke of Lancaster, 1310–1361 (PDF) (PhD thesis). Leeds: University of Leeds.
- Fowler, Kenneth Alan (1969). The King's Lieutenant: Henry of Grosmont, First Duke of Lancaster, 1310–1361. New York: Barnes & Noble. ISBN 9780389010036. OCLC 164491035.
- Gribit, Nicholas (2016). Henry of Lancaster's Expedition to Aquitaine 1345–46. Woodbridge, Suffolk: Boydell Press. ISBN 978-1783271177.
- Harris, Robin (1994). Valois Guyenne. Royal Historical Society Studies in History. Vol. 71. London: Boydell Press. ISBN 978-0861932269.
- Harvey, John (1976). The Black Prince and his Age. Totowa, New Jersey: Rowman & Littlefield. ISBN 978-0874718188.
- King, Andy (2002). "According to the Custom Used in French and Scottish Wars: Prisoners and Casualties on the Scottish Marches in the Fourteenth Century". Journal of Medieval History. 28 (3): 263–290. doi:10.1016/S0048-721X(02)00057-X. ISSN 0304-4181. S2CID 159873083.
- Lucas, Henry S. (1929). The Low Countries and the Hundred Years' War: 1326–1347. Ann Arbor: University of Michigan Press. OCLC 960872598.
- Oman, Charles (1998) [1924]. A History of the Art of War in the Middle Ages: 1278–1485 A.D. London: Greenhill Books. ISBN 978-1853673320.
- Ormrod, W.M. (2008). "Crécy and Calais, 1346–1347". Oxford Dictionary of National Biography (online ed.). Oxford University Press. doi:10.1093/ref:odnb/8519. (Subscription, Wikipedia Library access or UK public library membership required.)
- Ormrod, W. Mark (2012). Edward III. New Haven: Yale University Press. ISBN 978-0300119107.
- Prestwich, M. (13 September 2007). Plantagenet England 1225–1360. Oxford: Oxford University Press. ISBN 978-0199226870.
- Rodger, N.A.M. (2004). The Safeguard of the Sea. London: Penguin. ISBN 978-0140297249.
- Rogers, Clifford J (1994). "Edward III and the Dialectics of Strategy, 1327–1360". Transactions of the Royal Historical Society. 4. Cambridge: Cambridge University Press on behalf of the Royal Historical Society: 83–102. doi:10.2307/3679216. JSTOR 3679216. OCLC 931311378. S2CID 163041276.
- Rogers, Clifford J (2004). Bachrach, Bernard S; DeVries, Kelly; Rogers, Clifford J (eds.). "The Bergerac Campaign (1345) and the Generalship of Henry of Lancaster". Journal of Medieval Military History. II. Woodbridge, Suffolk: Boydell Press. ISBN 978-1843830405. ISSN 0961-7582.
- Sumption, Jonathan (1990). Trial by Battle. London: Faber and Faber. ISBN 978-0571200955.
- Sumption, Jonathon (1999). Trial by Fire. London: Faber and Faber. ISBN 0-571138969.
- Wagner, John A. (2006). "Auberoche, Battle of (1345)". Encyclopedia of the Hundred Years War. Woodbridge, Suffolk: Greenwood. p. 3. ISBN 978-0313327360.
