= Siege of Aiguillon =

1346 siege during the Hundred Years' War

Coordinates: 44°18′02″N 00°20′15″E

- Part of the Edwardian Phase of the Hundred Years' War
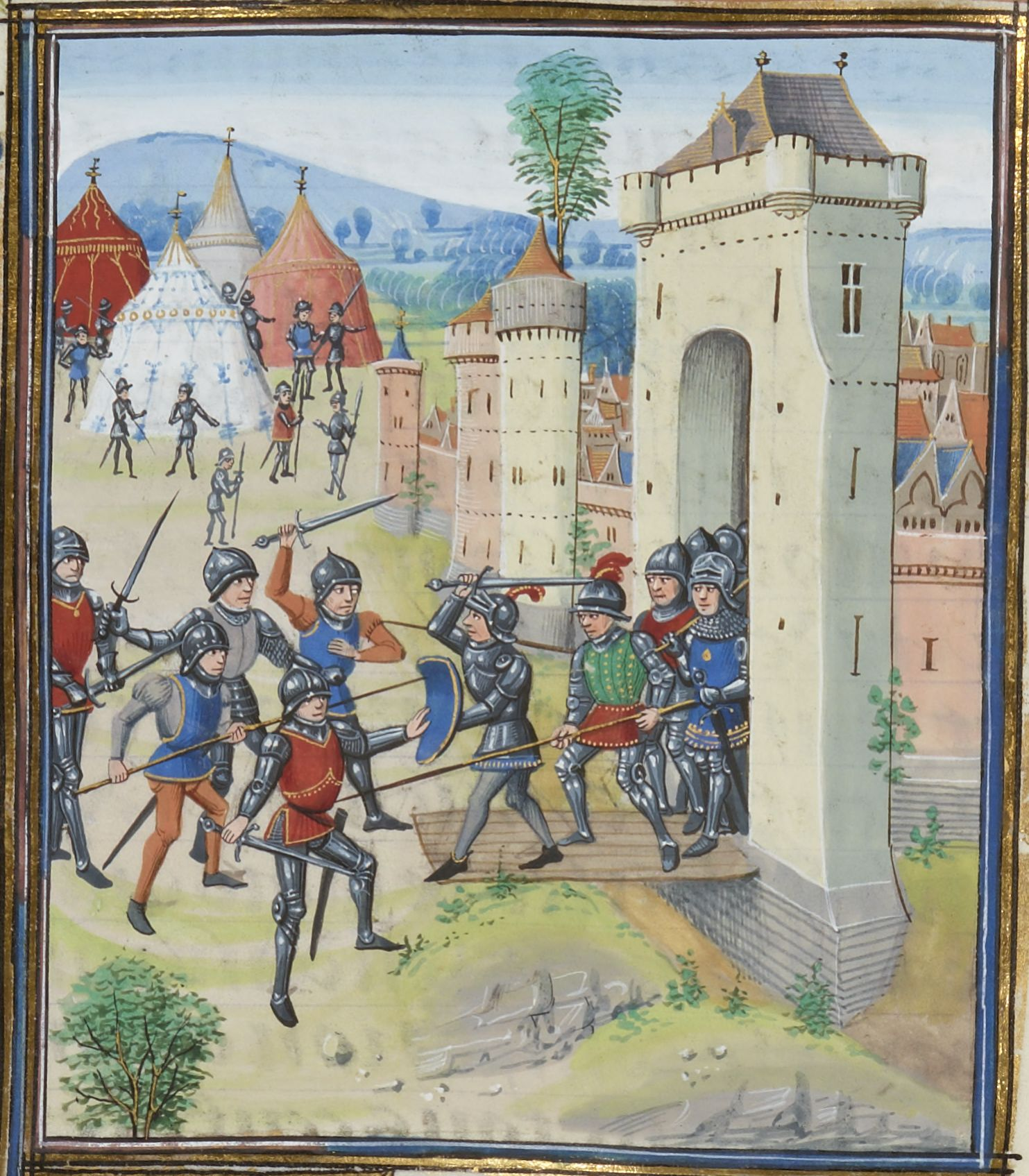
- A medieval town under assault. A miniature from a chronicle by Jean Froissart.
Date	1 April – 20 August 1346
Location	Aiguillon, south-west France
Result	English victory
Territorial changes	English retain Aiguillon

Belligerents
Kingdom of England	Kingdom of France

Commanders and leaders
Ralph, Earl of Stafford	John, Duke of Normandy

Strength
300 men-at-arms; 600 archers	15,000–20,000

Casualties and losses
Unknown	Unknown

The siege of Aiguillon, an episode in the Hundred Years' War, began on 1 April 1346 when a French army commanded by John, Duke of Normandy, laid siege to the Gascon town of Aiguillon. The town was defended by an Anglo-Gascon army under Ralph, Earl of Stafford.

In 1345 Henry, Earl of Lancaster, was sent to Gascony in south-west France with 2,000 men and large financial resources. In 1346 the French focused their effort on the south west and, early in the campaigning season, an army of 15,000–20,000 men marched down the valley of the Garonne. Aiguillon commands both the Rivers Garonne and Lot, and it was not possible to sustain an offensive further into Gascony unless the town was taken. Duke John, the son and heir apparent of Philip VI, laid siege to the town. The garrison, some 900 men, sortied repeatedly to interrupt the French operations, while Lancaster concentrated the main Anglo-Gascon force at La Réole, some 30 miles (48 km) away, as a threat. Duke John was never able to fully blockade the town, and found that his own supply lines were seriously harassed. On one occasion Lancaster used his main force to escort a large supply train into the town.

In July the main English army landed in northern France and moved towards Paris. Philip VI repeatedly ordered his son, Duke John, to break off the siege and bring his army north. Duke John, considering it a matter of honour, refused. By August, the French supply system had broken down, there was a dysentery epidemic in their camp, desertion was rife and Philip VI's orders were becoming imperious. On 20 August the French abandoned the siege and their camp and marched away. Six days later the main French army was decisively beaten in the Battle of Crécy with very heavy losses. Two weeks after this defeat, Duke John's army joined the French survivors.

== Background ==
France in 1330. Under French royal control in 1214 Gained from English control by 1330 England and English-controlled Guyenne/Gascony in 1330

Since the Norman Conquest of 1066, English monarchs had held titles and lands within France, the possession of which made them vassals of the kings of France. Over the centuries, English holdings in France had varied in size, but by 1337 only Gascony in south-western France and Ponthieu in northern France were left. The independent minded Gascons had their own customs and claimed to have a separate language. They preferred their relationship with a distant English king who left them alone to one with a French king who would interfere in their affairs. Following a series of disagreements between Philip VI of France and Edward III of England, on 24 May 1337 Philip's Great Council in Paris agreed that the Duchy of Aquitaine, effectively Gascony, should be taken back into Philip's hands on the grounds that Edward was in breach of his obligations as a vassal. This marked the start of the Hundred Years' War, which was to last one hundred and sixteen years.

=== Gascony ===
Before the war commenced at least 1,000 ships a year departed Gascony. Among their cargoes were over 80,000 tuns of locally produced wine. (Note: The tun was a wine cask used as a standard measure, and contained 252 gallons (954 litres) of wine. 80 thousand tuns of wine equates to 76,320,000 litres (16,790,000 imperial gallons; 20,160,000 US gallons)) The duty collected by the English Crown on wine from Bordeaux exceeded all other customs duties combined and was by far the largest source of state income. Bordeaux, the capital of Gascony, had a population of over 50,000, greater than London's, and Bordeaux was possibly richer. However, by this time English Gascony had become so truncated by French encroachments that it relied on imports of food, largely from England. Any interruptions to regular shipping were liable to starve Gascony and financially cripple England; the French were well aware of this.

Although Gascony was the cause of the war, Edward was able to spare few resources for it and whenever an English army campaigned on the continent it had operated in northern France. In most campaigning seasons the Gascons had had to rely on their own resources and had been hard-pressed by the French. In 1339, the French besieged Bordeaux, the capital of Gascony, even breaking into the city with a large force before they were repulsed. Typically the Gascons could field 3,000–6,000 men, the large majority infantry, although up to two-thirds of them would be tied down in garrisons.

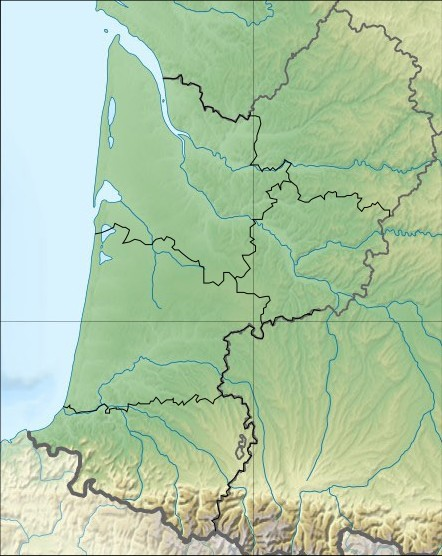
Location of Aiguillon in modern Nouvelle-Aquitaine, and other places named in the text

Nouvelle-Aquitaine within modern France

The border between English and French territory in Gascony was extremely unclear, to the extent that the idea of a "border" is anachronistic. Many landholders owned a patchwork of widely separated estates, perhaps owing fealty to a different overlord for each. Each small estate was likely to have a fortified tower or keep, and larger estates had castles. Fortifications were also constructed at transport choke points, to collect tolls and to restrict military passage; fortified towns grew up alongside all bridges and most fords over the many rivers in the region. Military forces could support themselves by foraging so long as they moved on at frequent intervals. If they wished to remain in one place for any length of time, as was necessary to besiege a castle, then access to water transport was essential for supplies of food and fodder and desirable for such items as siege equipment. Warfare was usually a struggle for possession of castles and other fortified points, and for the mutable loyalty of the local nobility; the region had been in a state of flux for centuries and many local lords served whichever country was stronger, regardless of national ties.

By 1345, after eight years of war, English-controlled territory mostly consisted of a coastal strip from Bordeaux to Bayonne, with isolated strongholds further inland. During 1345, Henry, Duke of Lancaster, (Note: During the 1345 campaign he was known as the Earl of Derby, but his father died in September 1345 and he became the Earl of Lancaster. Sumption 1990, p. 476) had led a whirlwind campaign at the head of an Anglo-Gascon army. He had smashed two large French armies at the battles of Bergerac and Auberoche, captured French towns and fortifications in much of Périgord and most of Agenais and given the English possessions in Gascony strategic depth. During the winter following this successful campaign Lancaster's second in command, Ralph, Earl of Stafford, had marched on the vitally important town of Aiguillon, which commanded the junction of the Rivers Garonne and Lot. The town's inhabitants had attacked the garrison and opened the gates to the English.

== Prelude ==
John, Duke of Normandy, the son and heir apparent of Philip VI, was placed in charge of all French forces in south-west France, as he had been the previous autumn. He assembled at Orléans the largest army the French had yet fielded in the south west. It was supported by every military officer of the royal household. As always, money was short. In spite of borrowing over 330,000 florins (£60,000,000 in 2025 terms (Note: UK Consumer Price Index inflation figures from 1209–2024 based on data from "Inflation calculator". Bank of England. London. 18 February 2026.)) from the Pope, Duke John had to issue orders to local officials to: "Amass all of the money you can for the support of our wars. Take it from each and every person you can..." It was a clear indication of the desperate state of the French finances. A second army was formed at Toulouse, based on contingents from the Languedoc; it included a siege train and five cannon. Duke John planned to march on and besiege the large, strongly fortified town of La Réole on the north bank of the Garonne river, only 35 miles (56 km) from Bordeaux, which Lancaster had captured the previous year. Aiguillon commanded both the Lot and the Garonne and its possession was essential to supply any army around La Réole.

Lancaster understood that no French offensive could have a permanent effect so long as Aiguillon, described by the modern historian Kenneth Fowler as "the key to the Gascon plain", was held, so he garrisoned it very strongly: 300 men-at-arms and 600 archers commanded by Stafford. The town was well stocked with supplies and materiel, although the physical defences were in a poor state. The main wall, 2,700 feet (820 m) long, was modern but incomplete – gaps were filled with improvised defences. A bridge over the River Lot was fortified and had a barbican gate, but it was centuries old and poorly maintained. There were two small forts within the town, both overlooking the Garonne. The northern wall of the town was protected by the Lot and the western by the Garonne, while the southern and eastern walls were more easily approached. Lancaster based himself in La Réole, on the Garonne 30 miles (48 km) downstream, throughout the siege.

== Siege ==
=== Investment ===
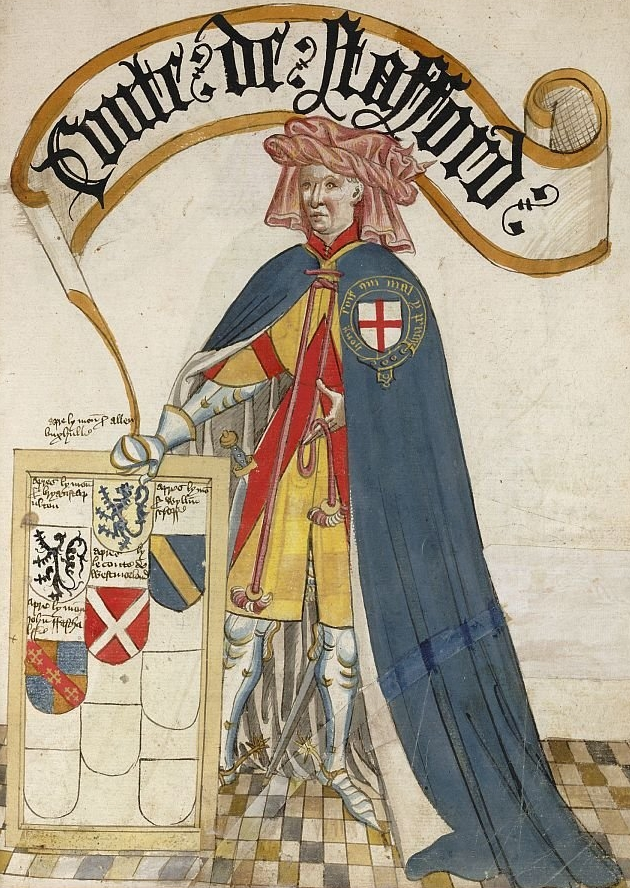
Ralph de Stafford, 1st Earl of Stafford

The French armies assembled and marched unusually early in the campaigning season. By March they were both in the province of Quercy. The size of the French forces at this point is not recorded, but it has been estimated that later in the campaign they numbered between 15,000 and 20,000; modern historians have described the French army as a "huge force" and as "enormously superior" to any force the Anglo-Gascons could field. The army marched down the valley of the Garonne from Agen, reaching Aiguillon on 1 April. On 2 April the arrière-ban, the formal call to arms for all able-bodied males, was announced for the south of France.

Isolating the town presented a problem for the French. The junction of the two rivers created three different areas, each of which would need to be interdicted. But separating their army into three divisions was inviting defeat in detail. They needed to be able to rapidly combine their forces if one part was threatened. A bridge over the Lot, 5 miles (8 km) from Aiguillon, was easily taken, but it was necessary to construct a new bridge over the Garonne. Duke John employed over 300 carpenters in its construction, escorted by 1,400 crossbowmen and an unknown but significant number of men-at-arms. The garrison sortied repeatedly against this work, sometimes several times a day. They twice broke it up, but it was completed by the end of May. The three parts of the French army each dug impressive earthworks, to protect themselves both from sorties by the garrison and from Lancaster's main army.

=== Operations ===
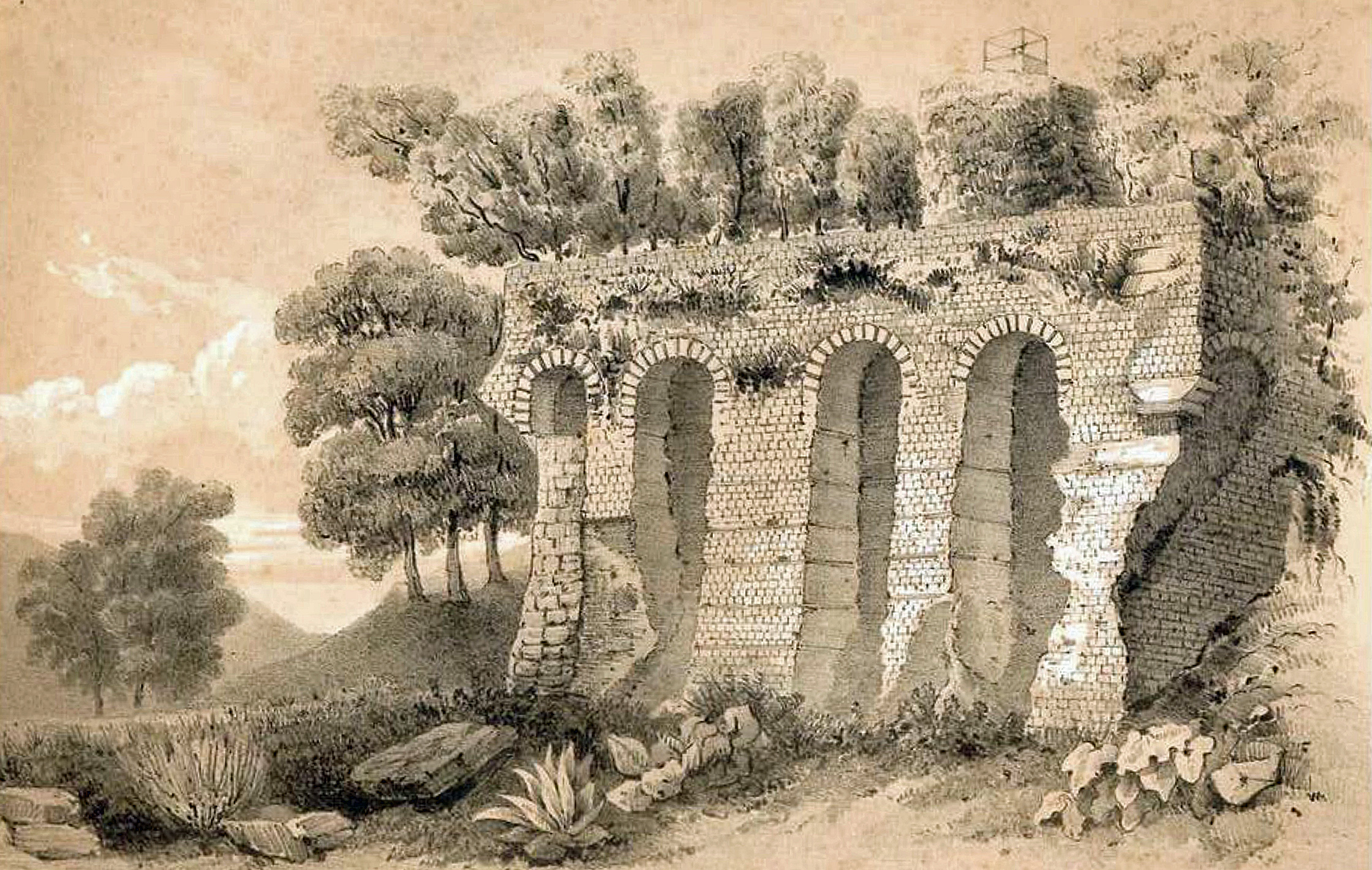
A derelict section of Aiguillon's walls, pictured in 1855

As was normal, within a matter of days the large French army had swept the surrounding area clear of supplies, and so was entirely dependent on the rivers for its logistics. The Anglo-Gascon army based in La Réole harassed the French foragers, intercepted their supplies and kept them in a constant state of alarm. Dysentery soon broke out in the French camps. In mid-June the French attempted to pass two large supply barges down the Lot to their contingent west of the Garonne. They needed to pass under the fortified bridge held by the garrison. The garrison sortied from the bridge's barbican, through the French lines, and captured the barges; bringing them into the town. Fierce fighting broke out as the sortie party attempted to retreat to the barbican, which after several hours was lost to the French. The garrison closed the gates and secured the town at the cost of trapping most of this party outside; the survivors were taken prisoner.

The French were unable to effectively isolate the town. Throughout the siege the Anglo-Gascons were able to run the blockade at will with small quantities of supplies and reinforcements. In July a larger force fought its way through with a greater quantity of supplies. From the start of the siege the French had concentrated their efforts against the southern side of the defences. At least twelve large siege engines, probably trebuchets, carried out a round-the-clock area bombardment. The results were considered unsatisfactory. In July an attack was attempted from the north, across the Lot, using three siege towers mounted on large barges. As they were being manoeuvred across the river one was hit by a missile from an English trebuchet, capsizing it with heavy loss. The attack was abandoned.

The siege became an end in itself for Duke John. Having laid siege to Aiguillon it was a matter of knightly honour not to retreat before it fell. At one point he solemnly vowed not to abandon the siege until he had occupied the town. By July the French were drawing supplies from over 200 miles (320 km) away, a distance barely sustainable with 14th-century overland transportation. In early 1346 the English captured the castle of Bajamont, 7 miles (11 km) from Agen, the capital of Agenais, on the Garonne. This was one of several strongholds from which the English carried out raids on the French lines of communication. In late July a French force of 2,000 men marched against it. The small English garrison under Galhart de Durfort attacked the French, defeated them, and captured their commander, Robert de Houdetot, the Seneschal of the Agenais. The French army began to starve; horses died for lack of fodder; the dysentery epidemic worsened; cases of desertion, increasingly to the English, mounted.

=== French withdrawal ===
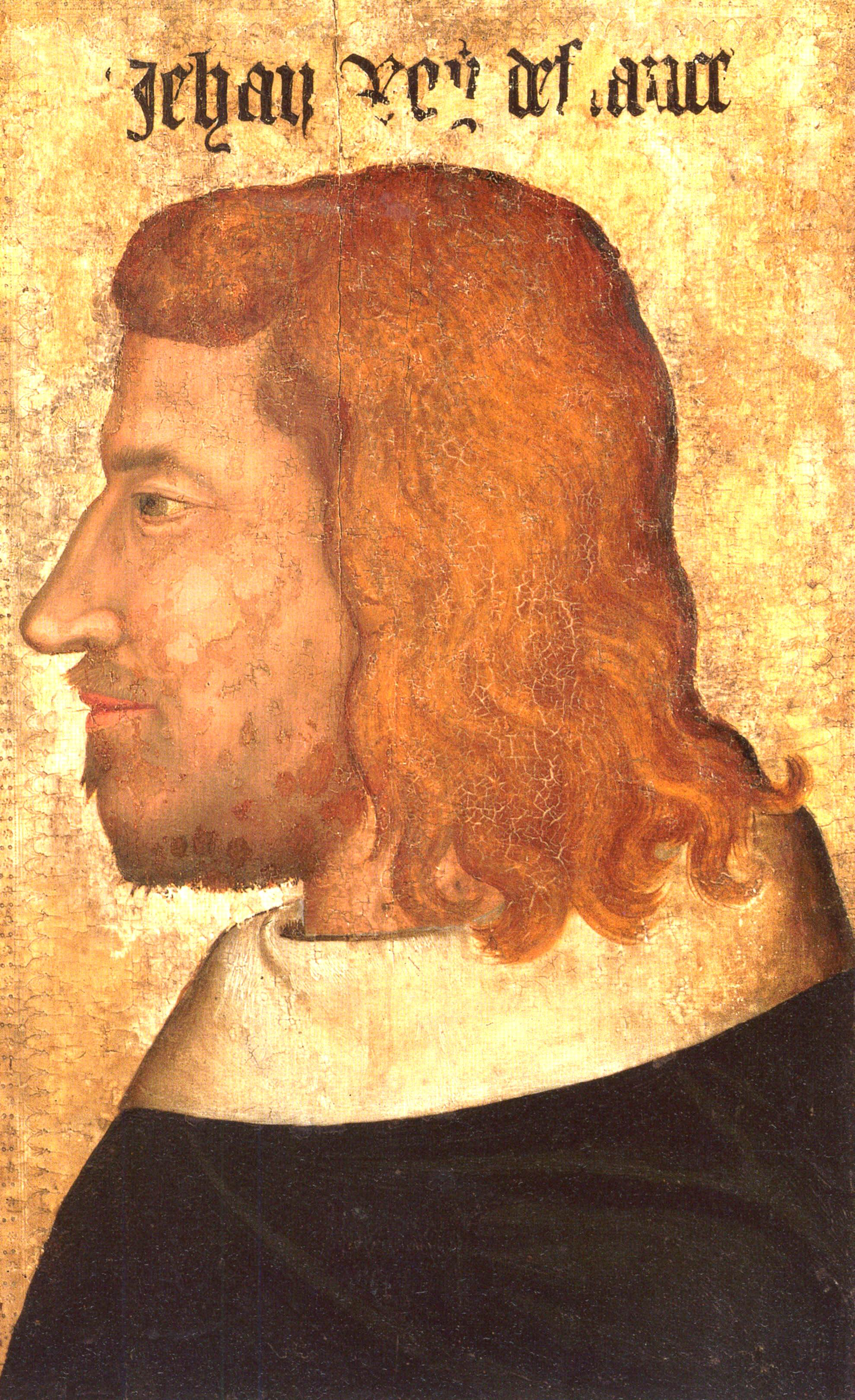
A contemporary image of John, Duke of Normandy (later King of France)

In 1345 Edward III had sent expeditionary forces to Gascony and Brittany and had assembled his main army for action in northern France or Flanders. It had sailed but never landed, after the fleet was scattered in a storm. Knowledge of Edward III's intent had kept French focus on the north until late in the campaigning season. In 1346 Edward III again gathered a large army, and the French once again became aware of this. The French assumed that Edward would sail for Gascony, where Lancaster was heavily outnumbered. To guard against any possibility of an English landing in northern France, Philip VI relied on his powerful navy.

This reliance was misplaced given the naval technology of the time and on 12 July an English army of 7,000–10,000 landed near Saint-Vaast-la-Hougue in north west Normandy. This force pillaged its way across the richest parts of France, capturing and sacking every town in its path. The English fleet paralleled its march, devastating everything up to five miles inland and destroying most of the French navy in its ports. Philip VI recalled his main army, under Duke John, from Gascony. After a furious argument with his advisers, and according to some accounts his father's messenger, Duke John refused to move until his honour was satisfied. On 29 July Philip VI called an arrière-ban for northern France at Rouen. On 7 August the English reached the Seine. Philip VI sent orders to Duke John insisting that he abandon the siege of Aiguillon and march his army north. Edward III marched south east and on 12 August his army was 20 miles (32 km) from Paris.

On 14 August, Duke John attempted to arrange a local truce. Lancaster, well aware of the situation in the north and in the French camps around Aiguillon, refused. On 20 August, after over five months, the French abandoned the siege and marched away in considerable haste and disorder. The French camps were left under the guard of local levies, who promptly deserted. The entire equipment of the French army was captured: supplies, materiel, siege engines and many horses. In at least the early stages of their retreat, discipline amongst the French was poor; there are accounts of men being jostled off the bridge over the Garonne and drowned. Stafford's garrison and other local Anglo-Gascon forces pursued closely. Part of Duke John's personal baggage was captured. French castles and minor fortifications along the Lot upstream from Aiguillon were mopped up, as were French positions between the Lot and the Dordogne.

== Aftermath ==
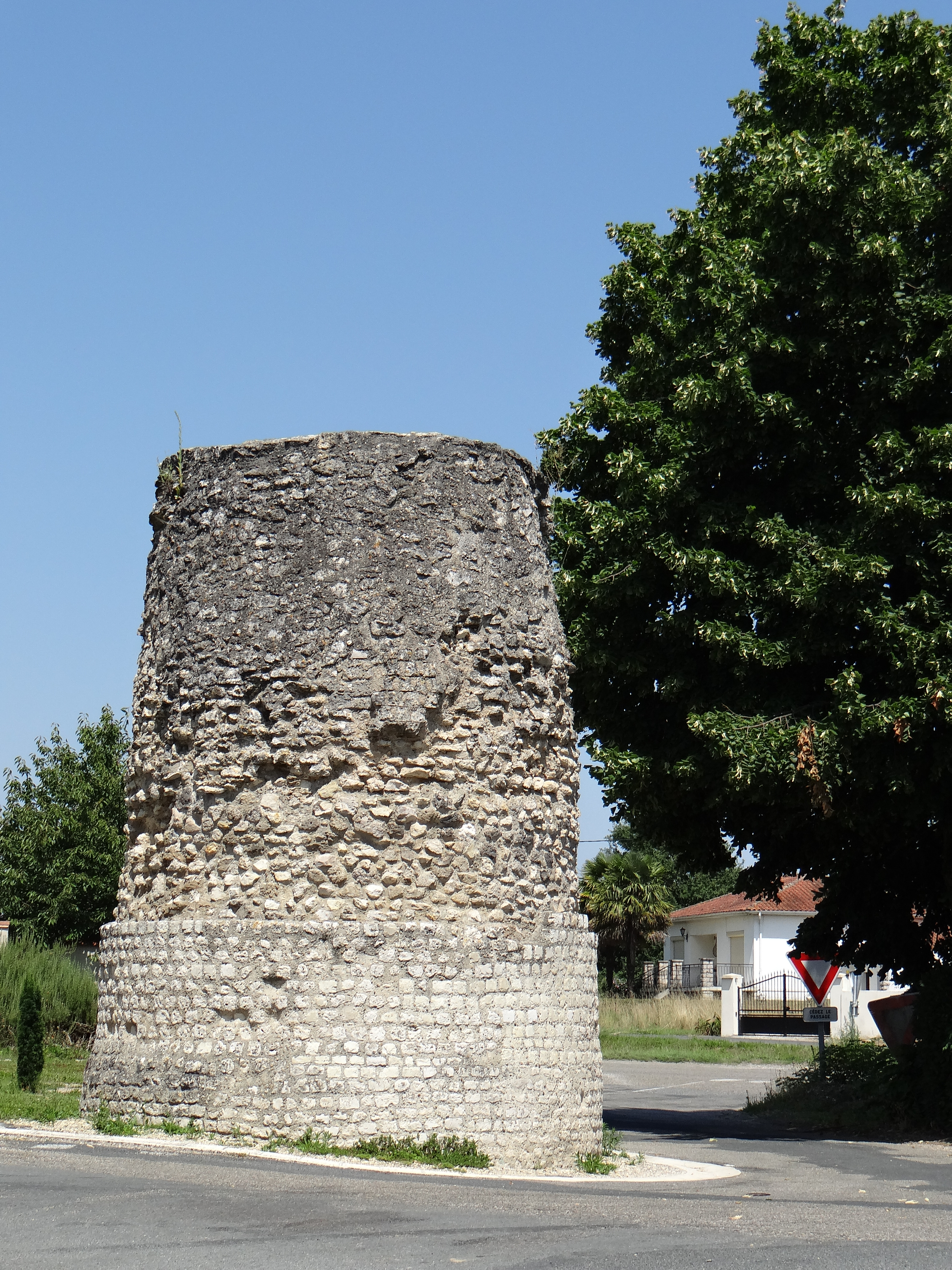
Remains of a tower in Aiguillon, known as La Tourasse

Duke John and his army made contact with Philip VI on, or shortly after, 7 September, two weeks after the French army of the north, 20,000–25,000 strong, had been decisively beaten at the Battle of Crécy with very heavy losses. After Crécy the French stripped their garrisons in the south west to build-up a new army to face the main English threat in the north east. The areas facing Lancaster were effectively defenceless.

He launched three separate offensives between September and November. Local Gascon forces besieged the few major strongholds in the Bazadais region still held by the French; they were all taken, including the town of Bazas. Further Gascon forces raided to the east, deep into Quercy, penetrating over 50 miles (80 km); the modern historian Jonathan Sumption describes this as "dislocating the royal administration in central and southern France for three months". Meanwhile, Lancaster himself took a small force, 1,000 men-at-arms and an unknown number of archers (possibly 1,000), 160 miles (260 km) to the north on a grand chevauchée, a great mounted raid, during which he captured the rich provincial capital of Poitiers, and many towns and castles throughout Saintonge and Aunis. With these offensives, Lancaster moved the focus of the fighting from the heart of Gascony to 50 miles or more beyond its borders.

== Notes, citations and sources ==
=== Sources ===
- Burne, Alfred (1999) [1955]. The Crecy War. Ware, Hertfordshire: Wordsworth Editions. ISBN 978-1-84022-210-4.
- Crowcroft, Robert; Cannon, John (2015). "Gascony". The Oxford Companion to British History. Oxford: Oxford University Press. p. 389. ISBN 978-0-19-967783-2.
- DeVries, Kelly (2006). Infantry Warfare in the Early Fourteenth Century: Discipline, Tactics, and Technology. Woodbridge, Suffolk; Rochester, NY: Boydell & Brewer. ISBN 978-0-85115-571-5.
- Fowler, Kenneth Alan (1961). Henry of Grosmont, First Duke of Lancaster, 1310–1361 (PDF) (PhD thesis). Leeds: University of Leeds. uk.bl.ethos.514189.
- Fowler, Kenneth Alan (1969). The King's Lieutenant: Henry of Grosmont, First Duke of Lancaster, 1310–1361. New York: Barnes & Noble. ISBN 978-0389010036. OCLC 164491035.
- Gribit, Nicholas (2016). Henry of Lancaster's Expedition to Aquitaine 1345–46. Woodbridge, Suffolk: Boydell and Brewer. ISBN 978-1-78327-117-7.
- Gribit, Nicholas (2016b). Siege and Conquest by Sword: The Second Campaign, 1346. Cambridge University Press. ISBN 978-1782046769.
- Harris, Robin (1994). Valois Guyenne. Royal Historical Society Studies in History. Vol. 71. London: Boydell and Brewer. ISBN 978-0-86193-226-9.
- Kaeuper, Richard W.; Kennedy, Elspeth (1996). The Book of Chivalry of Geoffroi de Charny: Text, Context and Translation. Philadelphia: University of Pennsylvania Press. ISBN 978-0812215793.
- Lucas, Henry S. (1929). The Low Countries and the Hundred Years' War: 1326–1347. Ann Arbor: University of Michigan Press. OCLC 960872598.
- Prestwich, M. (13 September 2007). Roberts, J. M. (ed.). Plantagenet England 1225–1360. Oxford: Oxford University Press. ISBN 978-0-19-922687-0.
- Rodger, N. A .M. (2004). The Safeguard of the Sea. London: Penguin. ISBN 978-0-14-029724-9.
- Rogers, Clifford J. (2004). "The Bergerac Campaign (1345) and the Generalship of Henry of Lancaster". In Bachrach, Bernard S; DeVries, Kelly; Rogers, Clifford J (eds.). Journal of Medieval Military History. Vol. II. Woodbridge, Suffolk: Boydell and Brewer. pp. 89–110. ISBN 978-1-84383-040-5. ISSN 0961-7582.
- Rogers, Clifford J. (2010). "Aiguillon, Siege of". In Rogers, Clifford J. (ed.). The Oxford Encyclopedia of Medieval Warfare and Military Technology. Vol. I. New York: Oxford University Press. p. 12. ISBN 978-0-19-533403-6.
- Sumption, Jonathan (1990). Trial by Battle. London: Faber and Faber. ISBN 978-0-571-20095-5.
- Vale, Malcolm (1999). "The War in Aquitaine". In Curry, Anne; Hughes, Michael (eds.). Arms, Armies and Fortifications in the Hundred Years War. Woodbridge, Suffolk: Boydell and Brewer. pp. 69–82. ISBN 978-0-85115-755-9.
- Wagner, John A. (2006). "Auberoche, Battle of (1345)". Encyclopedia of the Hundred Years War. Woodbridge, Suffolk: Greenwood. p. 3. ISBN 978-0-313-32736-0.
