= Chevauchée of Lancaster =

The Chevauchée of Lancaster may refer to:

- Gascon campaign of 1345, conducted by Henry of Grosmont, Earl of Derby, in south west France
- Chevauchée of 1346, conducted by Henry of Grosmont, 1st Duke of Lancaster in south west France.
- Chevauchée of 1356, conducted by Henry of Grosmont, 1st Duke of Lancaster in northern France
- Chevauchée of 1369, conducted by John of Gaunt, through northern France
- Chevauchée of 1373, conducted by John of Gaunt, through France
