= Lancaster's chevauchée of 1346 =

Campaign during the Hundred Years' War

- Part of the Edwardian Phase of the Hundred Years' War
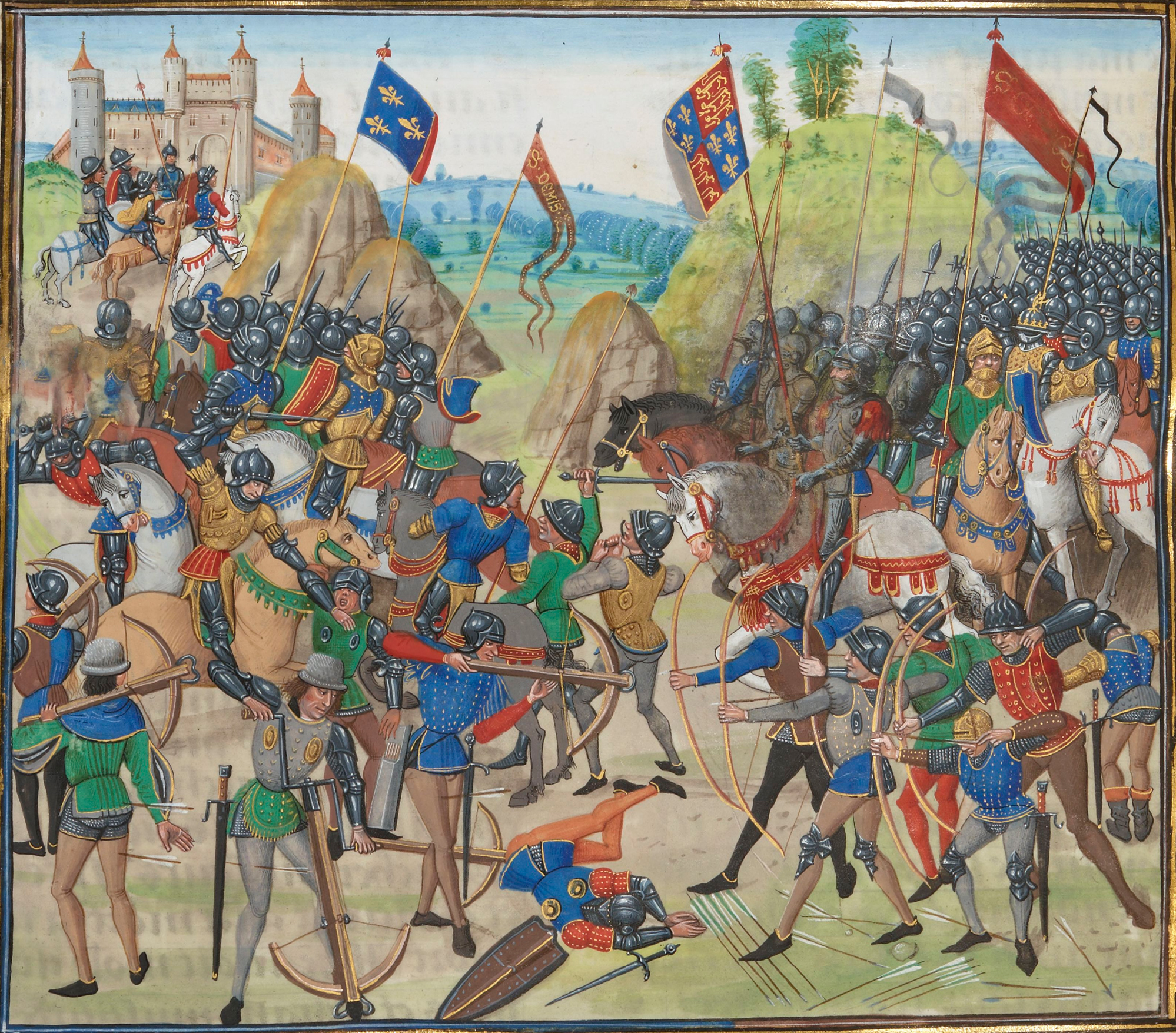
Date	1346
Location	Southwest France
Result	English victory
Territorial changes	Numerous towns and castles captured by the English

Belligerents
Kingdom of England	Kingdom of France

Commanders and leaders
Henry, Earl of Lancaster; Ralph, Baron Stafford	John, Count of Armagnac

Lancaster's chevauchée of 1346 was a series of offensives directed by Henry, Earl of Lancaster, in southwestern France during autumn 1346, as a part of the Hundred Years' War.

The year had started with a "huge" French army under John, Duke of Normandy, son and heir of King Philip VI, besieging the strategically important town of Aiguillon in Gascony. Lancaster refused battle and harassed the French supply lines while preventing Aiguillon from being blockaded. After a five-month siege the French were ordered north to confront the main English army, which on 12 July had landed in Normandy under Edward III of England and commenced the Crécy campaign.

This left the French defences in the southwest both weak and disorganised. Lancaster took advantage by launching offensives into Quercy and the Bazadais and himself leading a third force on a large-scale mounted raid (a chevauchée) between 12 September and 31 October 1346. All three offensives were successful, with Lancaster's chevauchée, of approximately 2,000 English and Gascon soldiers, meeting no effective resistance from the French, penetrating 160 miles (260 kilometres) north and storming the rich city of Poitiers. His force then burnt and looted large areas of Saintonge, Aunis and Poitou, capturing numerous towns, castles and smaller fortified places as they went. The offensives completely disrupted the French defences and shifted the focus of the fighting from the heart of Gascony to 50 miles (80 kilometres) or more beyond its borders.

== Background ==
Since the Norman Conquest of 1066, English monarchs had held titles and lands within France, the possession of which made them vassals of the kings of France. By 1337 only Gascony in southwestern France and Ponthieu in northern France were left. The independent-minded Gascons preferred their relationship with a distant English king who left them alone to one with a French king who would interfere in their affairs. Following a series of disagreements between Philip VI of France (r. 1328–1350) and Edward III of England (r. 1327–1377), on 24 May 1337 Philip's Great Council agreed Gascony should be taken back into Philip's hands, on the grounds that Edward was in breach of his obligations as a vassal. This marked the start of the Hundred Years' War, which was to last 116 years.

France in 1330 Under French royal control in 1214 Gained from English control by 1330 England and English-controlled Gascony in 1330

Before the war commenced, at least 1000 ships a year departed from Gascony. Among their cargoes were over 80,000 tuns of locally produced wine. (Note: The tun was a wine cask used as a standard measure, and contained 252 gallons (954 litres) of wine. 80 thousand tuns of wine equates to 76,320,000 litres (16,790,000 imperial gallons; 20,160,000 US gallons)) The duty levied by the English Crown on wine from Bordeaux was more than all other customs duties combined and by far the largest source of state income. Bordeaux, the capital of Gascony, had a population of over 50,000, greater than London's, and was possibly richer. However, by this time English Gascony had become so truncated by French encroachments that it relied on imports of food, largely from England. Any interruptions to regular shipping were liable to starve Gascony and financially cripple England; the French were well aware of this.

The border between English and French territory in Gascony was extremely unclear. Many landholders owned a patchwork of widely separated estates, perhaps owing fealty to a different overlord for each. Each small estate was likely to have a fortified tower or keep, with larger estates having castles. Fortifications were also constructed at transport choke points, to collect tolls and to restrict military passage; fortified towns grew up alongside all bridges and most fords over the many rivers in the region. Military forces could support themselves by foraging so long as they moved on frequently. If they wished to remain in one place for any length of time, as was necessary to besiege a castle, then access to water transport was essential for supplies of food and fodder and desirable for such items as siege equipment.

Although Gascony was the cause of the war, in most campaigning seasons the Gascons had had to rely on their own resources and had been hard pressed by the French. In 1339 the French besieged Bordeaux, the capital of Gascony, even breaking into the city with a large force before they were repulsed. Typically the Gascons could field 3,000–6,000 men, the large majority infantry, although up to two-thirds of them would be tied down in garrisons. Warfare was usually a struggle for possession of castles and other fortified points, and for the mutable loyalty of the local nobility.

=== 1345 campaign ===
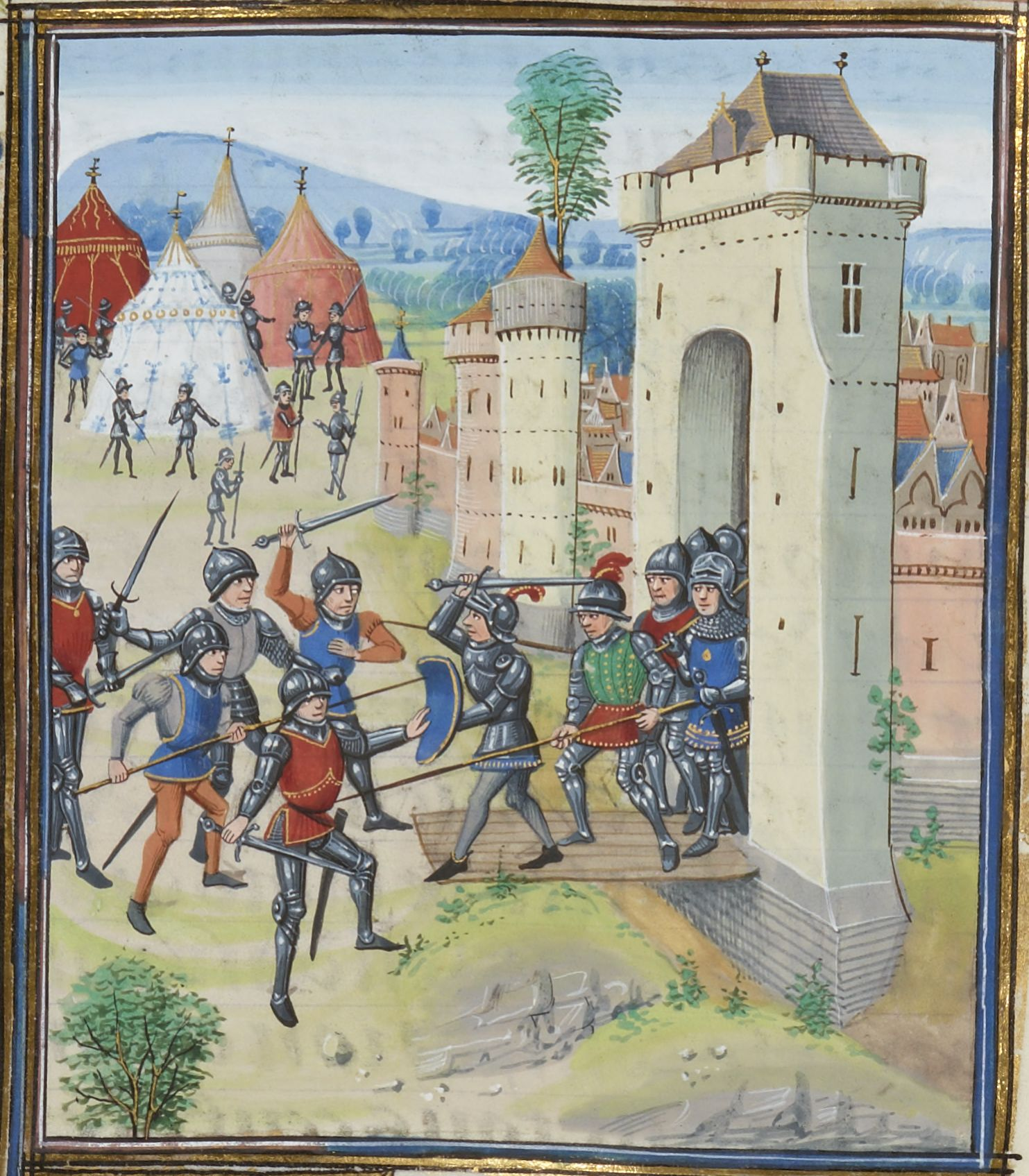
A medieval town under assault (15th-century miniature)

By 1345, after eight years of war, English-controlled territory mostly consisted of a coastal strip from Bordeaux to Bayonne, with isolated strongholds further inland. In 1345 Edward III had sent Henry, Earl of Lancaster to Gascony, and had assembled his main army for action in northern France or Flanders. It had sailed but never landed, after the fleet was scattered in a storm. Knowledge of Edward III's intent had kept French focus on the north until late in the campaigning season. Meanwhile, Lancaster (Note: During the 1345 campaign he was known as the Earl of Derby, but his father died in September 1345 and he became the Earl of Lancaster. Sumption 1990, p. 476.) had led a whirlwind campaign at the head of an Anglo-Gascon army. He had smashed two large French armies at the battles of Bergerac and Auberoche, captured French towns and fortifications in much of Périgord and most of Agenais and given the English possessions in Gascony strategic depth. During the winter following this successful campaign, Lancaster's second in command, Ralph, Earl of Stafford, had marched on the vitally important town of Aiguillon, which commanded the junction of the Rivers Garonne and Lot, making it important both for trade and for military communications. The inhabitants had attacked the garrison and opened the gates to the English.

== French offensive ==
John, Duke of Normandy, the son and heir of Philip VI, was placed in charge of all French forces in southwest France, as he had been the previous autumn. In March 1346 a French army under Duke John, numbering between 15,000 and 20,000, enormously superior to any force the Anglo-Gascons could field, marched on Aiguillon and besieged it on 1 April. On 2 April an arrière-ban, a formal call to arms for all able-bodied males, was announced for southern France. French national financial, logistical and manpower efforts were focused on this offensive.

Edward III again gathered a large army in England. The French were aware of this, but given the extreme difficulty of disembarking an army other than at a port, the English no longer having access to a port in Flanders, and the existence of friendly ports in Brittany and Gascony, they assumed that Edward would sail for one of the latter; probably Gascony, in order to relieve Aiguillon. To guard against any possibility of an English landing in northern France, Philip VI relied on his powerful navy. This reliance was misplaced given the naval technology of the time and the French were unable to prevent Edward III successfully crossing the Channel and landing in the Cotentin Peninsula, in northern Normandy, on 12 July with an army between 12,000 and 15,000 strong. The English achieved complete strategic surprise and marched south, cutting a wide swath of destruction through some of the richest lands in France and burning every town they passed.

Philip VI immediately recalled his main army, under Duke John, from Gascony. After a furious argument with his advisers, and according to some accounts his father's messenger, Duke John refused to move until his honour was satisfied. On 29 July Philip VI called an arrière-ban for northern France at Rouen. On 7 August the English reached the Seine. Philip VI again sent orders to John of Normandy insisting that he abandon the siege of Aiguillon and march his army north. Edward III marched south east and on 12 August his army was 20 miles (32 kilometres) from Paris. On 14 August Duke John attempted to arrange a local truce. Lancaster, well aware of the situation in the north and in the French camps around Aiguillon, refused. On 20 August, after over five months, the French abandoned the siege and marched away in considerable haste and disorder. Duke John did not rejoin the French army in the north until after it had been heavily defeated at the Battle of Crécy six days later.

== Anglo-Gascon offensive ==
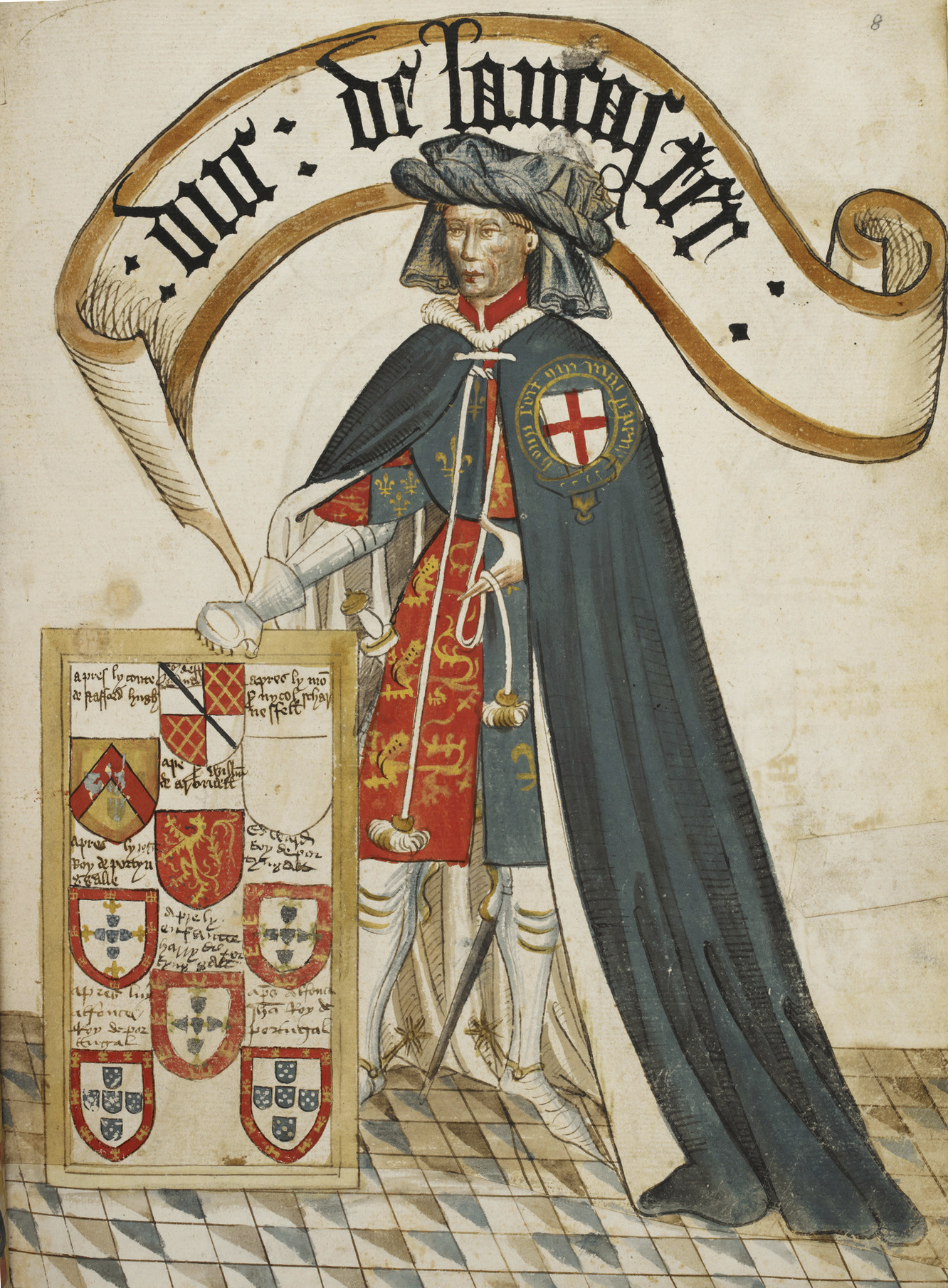
Henry of Grosmont, Earl of Lancaster, Earl of Derby

The withdrawal of Duke John's army led to the collapse of the French positions in southern Périgord and most of Agenais. The French only held on to their strongholds in the Garonne valley, Port-Sainte-Marie, Agen and Marmande downstream of Aiguillon. The English extended their control to include the whole of the Lot valley below Villeneuve and most of the remaining French outposts between the Lot and the Dordogne, during late August. Lancaster was able to capture most towns without a fight. John, Count of Armagnac, was appointed French royal lieutenant in the region after Duke John's withdrawal. He struggled to provide effective resistance because of lack of troops; insufficient funds; and repeatedly having his orders countermanded by Philip VI. He formally offered his resignation within three months of his appointment.

Lancaster now held the operational initiative. In early September he launched three separate offensives. Local English sympathisers in the Agenais under Gaillard I de Durfort blockaded Agen and Porte Sainte Marie and raided into Quercy to the west. A large detachment of Gascons was split up to reoccupy the French-held territory to the south and west of the Garonne under the overall command of Alixandre de Caumont, in a mopping up operation. Lancaster took command of 1,000 men-at-arms and approximately the same number of mounted infantry and led them north on 12 September; most of this force was Gascon.

The force in the Agenais raided deep into Quercy, penetrating over 50 miles (80 kilometres). Gaillard, leading 400 cavalry, captured the small town of Tulle. This sparked widespread panic in the province of Auvergne. The army of John of Armagnac was diverted to Tulle, which it besieged from mid-November until late December, when the Gascon occupiers surrendered on terms and were taken prisoner; all were ransomed. The whole French field army of the southwest was tied down by Gaillard's small force. The modern historian Jonathan Sumption describes this as "dislocating the royal administration in central and southern France for three months".

The troops under Caumont swept through the Bazadais, capturing numerous French-held towns and fortifications for little or no loss. Many of these were handed over after negotiations; Bazas itself for example surrendered after negotiating access for its products through English-occupied territory on favourable terms. The French presence in the area was all but extinguished.

=== Lancaster's chevauchée ===
Map of route of Lancaster's chevauchée of 1346

Lancaster targeted the rich provincial capital of Poitiers, deep in French-held territory – 160 miles (260 kilometres) north of his starting point. He marched from the Garonne to the Charente, 80 miles (130 kilometres), in eight days, arriving at Châteauneuf-sur-Charente which he captured. He then diverted 40 miles (64 kilometres) to Saint-Jean-d'Angély to rescue some English prisoners. Saint-Jean-d'Angély was stormed, captured, and sacked. Leaving a garrison, Lancaster turned back towards Poitiers, covering 20 miles a day and taking the towns of Melle and Lusignan on the way. Lancaster reached Poitiers late on 3 October.

Poitiers occupied a naturally strong position, but its defences had seen little maintenance for centuries. The city had no royal garrison and the townspeople and local notables had fallen out of the habit of maintaining a guard. Defensive responsibilities were split between the town and three different church bodies, which had the effect of preventing any effective action. The English launched an immediate assault, but they were repulsed by an improvised force organised by some local noblemen. During the night the English found a breach in the wall, which had been deliberately created years before to allow easy access from the city to a nearby watermill. In the morning they seized it and forced their way into eastern Poitiers, killing everyone they came across. As was usual, only those who appeared wealthy enough to afford a ransom were spared. Most of the population fled the city, but over 600 were killed. The town was thoroughly sacked for eight days.

Lancaster was unable to take the royal mint at Montreuil-Bonnin, 5 miles (8 kilometres) west of Poitiers, and marched rapidly back to Saint-Jean-d'Angély. He made no attempt to hold Poitiers; in the province of Poitou he only left troops at Lusignan, a small town with good walls and a strong, modern castle. Once back in Saintonge he took control of the Boutonne valley all the way to the sea, including the major port of Rochefort and the well-fortified island of Oléron. Lancaster then marched south, taking a large number of small towns and fortifications. The French were left in control of much of Saintonge: the eastern parts; the larger fortifications such as the province's capital, Saintes, and its strongest castle, Taillebourg; and several strategically important strongholds on the east bank of the Gironde. Lancaster arrived in Bordeaux, the capital of English Gascony, on 31 October seven weeks after he set out on his chevauchée. He returned to England in early 1347.

== Aftermath ==
Lancaster left garrisons in the captured towns and castles throughout Saintonge and Aunis, with an especially large garrison at Saint-Jean-d'Angély. The Anglo-Gascons supported themselves by raiding French-held and French-leaning territory; as Sumption puts it, they "were not so much expected to control territory as to create chaos and insecurity". Whole provinces, securely held by the French only months before, were overrun by bandits, freebooters, deserters and retained troops of both sides. The population moved away from the villages to the relative safety of the towns, townsfolk who could, moved away from the area, and much of the agricultural land went uncultivated. The French ability to counter-attack was lost as they concentrated on attempting to defend the host of newly vulnerable locations or on recovering towns captured deep in what had been considered safe territory, as at Tulle. French trade declined and their taxation income from the area was severely curtailed. Lancaster had moved the focus of the fighting from the heart of Gascony to 50 miles or more beyond its borders.

The English army in the north, after its victory at Crécy, went on to besiege Calais. Lancaster joined it there in the summer of 1347 and was present when Calais fell after an eleven-month siege, securing an English entrepôt into northern France which was held for two hundred years. The war in southwest France stayed far from Gascony. In 1355 Edward III's eldest son, Edward, the Black Prince, led a large-scale chevauchée north from Bordeaux that devastated France. After another devastating chevauchée in 1356, the French army, commanded by Duke John, now King John II of France, intercepted it and forced the outnumbered English to battle 3 miles (4.8 kilometres) from Poitiers; the French were decisively defeated and John was captured.

== Notes, citations and sources ==
=== Sources ===
- Burne, Alfred (1999) [1955]. The Crecy War. Ware, Hertfordshire: Wordsworth Editions. ISBN 978-1-84022-210-4.
- Crowcroft, Robert; Cannon, John (2015). "Gascony". The Oxford Companion to British History. Oxford: Oxford University Press. p. 389. ISBN 978-0-19-967783-2.
- Curry, Anne (2002). The Hundred Years' War 1337–1453 (PDF). Oxford: Osprey Publishing. ISBN 978-1-84176-269-2. Archived from the original (PDF) on 27 September 2018.
- DeVries, Kelly (2006). Infantry Warfare in the Early Fourteenth Century: Discipline, Tactics, and Technology. Woodbridge, Suffolk; Rochester, New York: Boydell Press. ISBN 978-0-85115-571-5.
- Fowler, Kenneth (1961). Henry of Grosmont, First Duke of Lancaster, 1310–1361 (PDF) (PhD thesis). Leeds: University of Leeds.
- Gribit, Nicholas A. (2016). Henry of Lancaster's Expedition to Aquitaine, 1345–1346: Military Service and Professionalism in the Hundred Years War. Warfare in History. Vol. 42. Woodbridge, Suffolk: Boydell & Brewer. ISBN 978-1-78327-117-7.
- Harris, Robin (1994). Valois Guyenne: A Study of Politics, Government, and Society in Late Medieval France. Royal Historical Society Studies in History. Vol. 71. London: Boydell Press. ISBN 978-0-86193-226-9.
- King, Andy (2002). "According to the Custom Used in French and Scottish Wars: Prisoners and Casualties on the Scottish Marches in the Fourteenth Century". Journal of Medieval History. 28 (3): 263–290. doi:10.1016/S0048-721X(02)00057-X. ISSN 0304-4181. S2CID 159873083.
- Lacey, Robert (2008). Great Tales from English History. London: Folio Society. OCLC 261939337.
- Lucas, Henry S. (1929). The Low Countries and the Hundred Years' War: 1326–1347. Ann Arbor: University of Michigan Press. OCLC 960872598.
- Oman, Charles (1998) [1924]. A History of the Art of War in the Middle Ages: 1278–1485 A.D. London: Greenhill Books. ISBN 978-1-85367-332-0.
- Ormrod, W. M. (2005). "Henry of Lancaster, First Duke of Lancaster (c. 1310–1361)". Oxford Dictionary of National Biography (online ed.). Oxford University Press. doi:10.1093/ref:odnb/12960. (Subscription, Wikipedia Library access or UK public library membership required.)
- Rodger, N. A. M. (2004). The Safeguard of the Sea. London: Penguin. ISBN 978-0-14-029724-9.
- Rogers, Clifford J. (2004). Bachrach, Bernard S.; DeVries, Kelly; Rogers, Clifford J. (eds.). The Bergerac Campaign (1345) and the Generalship of Henry of Lancaster. Journal of Medieval Military History. Vol. 2. Woodbridge, Suffolk: Boydell Press. ISBN 978-1-84383-040-5. ISSN 0961-7582.
- Rogers, Clifford J. (2010). "Aiguillon, Siege of". In Rogers, Clifford J. (ed.). The Oxford Encyclopedia of Medieval Warfare and Military Technology, Volume 1. New York: Oxford University Press. p. 12. ISBN 978-0195334036.
- Sumption, Jonathan (1990). The Hundred Years War I: Trial by Battle. London: Faber and Faber. ISBN 978-0-571-20095-5.
- Vale, Malcolm (1999). "The War in Aquitaine". In Curry, Anne; Hughes, Michael (eds.). Arms, Armies and Fortifications in the Hundred Years War. Woodbridge, Suffolk: Boydell & Brewer. pp. 69–82. ISBN 978-0-85115-755-9.
- Wagner, John A. (2006). "Auberoche, Battle of (1345)". Encyclopedia of the Hundred Years War. Woodbridge, Suffolk: Greenwood. p. 3. ISBN 978-0-313-32736-0.
