= Gascon campaign of 1345 =

Military campaign during the Hundred Years' War

- Part of the Edwardian Phase of the Hundred Years' War
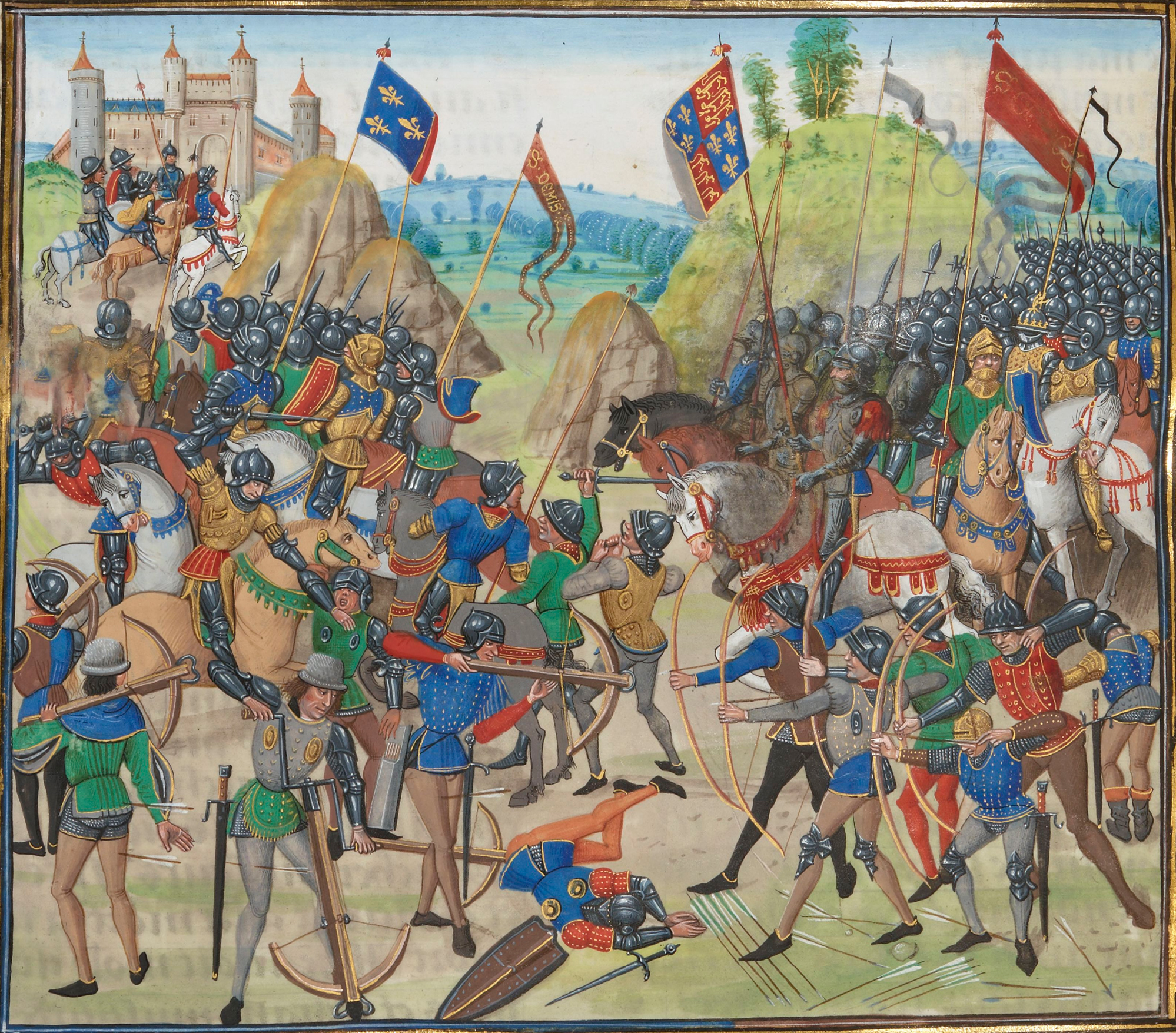
- A battle between French and English armies, as imagined by a contemporary chronicler
Date	1345
Location	Gascony, south-west France
Result	English victory
Territorial changes	Numerous towns and castles captured by the English

Belligerents
Kingdom of England	Kingdom of France

Commanders and leaders
Henry of Lancaster; Ralph, Earl of Stafford	John, Duke of Normandy; Louis of Poitiers †; Bertrand de l'Isle (POW)

Strength
Under 8,000 at any time	Up to 20,000

Casualties and losses
Light	Very heavy

The Gascon campaign of 1345 was conducted by Henry, Earl of Derby, as part of the Hundred Years' War. The whirlwind campaign took place between August and November 1345 in Gascony, an English-controlled territory in south-west France. Derby, commanding an Anglo-Gascon force, oversaw the first successful English land campaign of the war. He twice defeated large French armies in battle, taking many noble and knightly prisoners. They were ransomed by their captors, greatly enriching Derby and his soldiers in the process. Following this campaign, morale and prestige swung England's way in the border region between English-held Gascony and French-ruled territory, providing an influx of taxes and recruits for the English armies. As a result, France's ability to raise tax money and troops from the region was much reduced.

Ralph, Earl of Stafford, had sailed for Gascony in February 1345 with an advance force and, following conventional practice, laid siege to two French strongholds. Derby arrived in August and immediately concentrated available Anglo-Gascon forces and headed directly for the largest French force, which was gathering at Bergerac, 60 miles (97 km) east of Bordeaux. Bergerac had good river supply links to Bordeaux and would provide a suitable forward base from which to carry the war to the French. He decisively defeated the French there, before moving to besiege the provincial capital of Périgueux. By this time the French had diverted their main effort to the south west, under the overall command of John, Duke of Normandy, the son and heir apparent of King Philip VI of France. Unable to take Périgueux, and threatened by John's much larger force, Derby left garrisons blockading it and withdrew. One garrison, at Auberoche, was besieged by the French. Derby advanced with a small force, launched a surprise attack against the much larger French army and won another decisive victory.

The French army started to disintegrate: men were unpaid, even unfed; there was a lack of fodder for the horses; desertion was rife; and troops were selling their equipment. John lost heart on hearing of the defeat at Auberoche. The French abandoned all of their ongoing sieges of other Anglo-Gascon garrisons and retreated to Angoulême, where John disbanded his army, possibly because the French had run out of money. Derby moved back to the Garonne valley, captured the strong and well garrisoned town of La Réole, all of the French outposts downstream of it, and other strong French positions in the area. In November Derby paid off his army and overwintered in La Réole. Various small Anglo-Gascon groups maintained the pressure on the French, capturing several significant fortified places between December 1345 and March 1346.

== Background ==
Since the Norman Conquest of England in 1066, English monarchs had held titles and lands within France, the possession of which made them vassals of the kings of France. The status of the English king's French fiefs was a major source of conflict between the two monarchies throughout the Middle Ages. French monarchs systematically sought to check the growth of English power, stripping away lands as the opportunity arose. Over the centuries, English holdings in France had varied in size, but by 1337 only Gascony in south-western France and Ponthieu in northern France were left. The independent-minded Gascons had their own customs and used a separate Gascon language alongside French; they preferred their relationship with a distant English king who left them alone, to one with a French king who would interfere in their affairs. Following a series of disagreements between Philip VI of France (r. 1328–1350) and Edward III of England (r. 1327–1377), on 24 May 1337 Philip's Great Council agreed that the Duchy of Aquitaine, effectively Gascony, should be taken back into Philip's hands on the grounds that Edward was in breach of his obligations as a vassal. This marked the start of the Hundred Years' War, which was to last 116 years.

=== Gascony ===
France in 1330. Under French royal control in 1214 Gained from English control by 1330 England and English-controlled Guyenne/Gascony in 1330

Before the war commenced, at least 1,000 ships a year departed Gascony. Among their cargoes were over 80,000 tuns of locally produced wine. (Note: The tun was a wine cask used as a standard measure, and contained 252 gallons (954 litres) of wine. 80 thousand tuns of wine equates to 76,320,000 litres (16,790,000 imperial gallons; 20,160,000 US gallons)) The duty levied by the English Crown on wine from Bordeaux raised more money than all other customs duties combined and was by far the largest source of state income. Bordeaux, the capital of Gascony, grew rich on this trade; it had a population of over 50,000, greater than London's, and Bordeaux was possibly richer. By this time English Gascony had become so truncated by French encroachments that it relied on imports of food, largely from England. Any interruptions to regular shipping were liable to starve Gascony and financially cripple England; the French were well aware of this.

Although Gascony was the cause of the war, Edward was able to spare few resources for it. When an English army had campaigned on the continent earlier in the war it had operated in northern France, causing the Gascons to largely rely on their own resources; they had been hard pressed as a consequence. In 1339 the French besieged Bordeaux, even breaking into the city with a large force before they were repulsed. Typically the Gascons could field 3,000–6,000 men, the large majority of whom were infantry, although up to two-thirds of them would be tied down in garrisons.

There was no formal border between English and French territory. Many landholders owned a patchwork of widely separated estates, perhaps owing fealty to a different overlord for each. Each small estate was likely to have a tower house, larger estates had castles. Fortifications were also constructed at transport choke points, to collect tolls and to restrict military passage; fortified towns grew up alongside all bridges and most fords over the many rivers in the region. Military forces could support themselves by foraging so long as they moved on at frequent intervals. If they wished to remain in one place for any length of time, as was necessary to besiege a castle, then access to water transport was essential for supplies of food and fodder and desirable for such items as siege equipment. Warfare was usually a struggle for possession of castles and other fortified points, and for the mutable loyalty of the local nobility; the region had been in a state of flux for centuries and many local lords served whichever country was stronger, regardless of national ties.

By 1345, after eight years of war, English-controlled territory mostly consisted of a coastal strip from Bordeaux to Bayonne, and isolated strongholds further inland. The French had strong fortifications throughout what had once been English-controlled Gascony. Several directly threatened Bordeaux: Libourne, 20 miles (32 km) to the east allowed French armies to assemble a day's march from Bordeaux; the strongly fortified town of Blaye was situated on the north bank of the Gironde 25 miles (40 km) downstream of Bordeaux and in a position to interdict its vital seaborne communications; the fortress of Langon, 30 mi (48 km) south of Bordeaux, blocked upstream communication along the Garonne, and facilitated the supply of any French force advancing on Bordeaux.

== Campaign ==
The main troop movements in south-west France between August and November 1345 Red arrows – Derby's advance to Bergerac and Périgueux Orange arrow – Derby's withdrawal Blue arrows – Louis of Poitiers' advance to Périgueux and Auberoche Pink arrow – Derby's return to Auberoche Green arrow – Derby's move back to Gascony and La Réole

=== Plans ===
Edward determined early in 1345 to attack France on three fronts. The Earl of Northampton would lead a small force to Brittany, a slightly larger force would proceed to Gascony under the command of Henry, Earl of Derby, and the main force would accompany Edward to either northern France or Flanders. The previous Seneschal of Gascony, Nicholas de la Beche, was replaced by the more senior Ralph, Earl of Stafford, who sailed for Gascony in February with an advance force. Derby was appointed the King's Lieutenant in Gascony on 13 March 1345 and received a contract to raise a force of 2,000 men in England, and further troops in Gascony itself. The highly detailed contract of indenture had a term of six months from the opening of the campaign in Gascony, with an option for Edward to extend it for a further six months on the same terms. Derby was given a high degree of autonomy, for example his strategic instructions were: "si guerre soit, et a faire le bien q'il poet" (... if there is war, do the best you can ...).

French intelligence had uncovered the English plan for offensives in the three theatres, but France did not have the money to raise an army in each. The French anticipated, correctly, that the English planned to make their main effort in northern France. Thus they directed what resources they had there, planning to assemble their main army at Arras on 22 July. South-western France was encouraged to rely on its own resources, but as the Truce of Malestroit, signed in early 1343, was still in effect, the local lords were reluctant to spend money, and little was done.

=== Initial operations ===
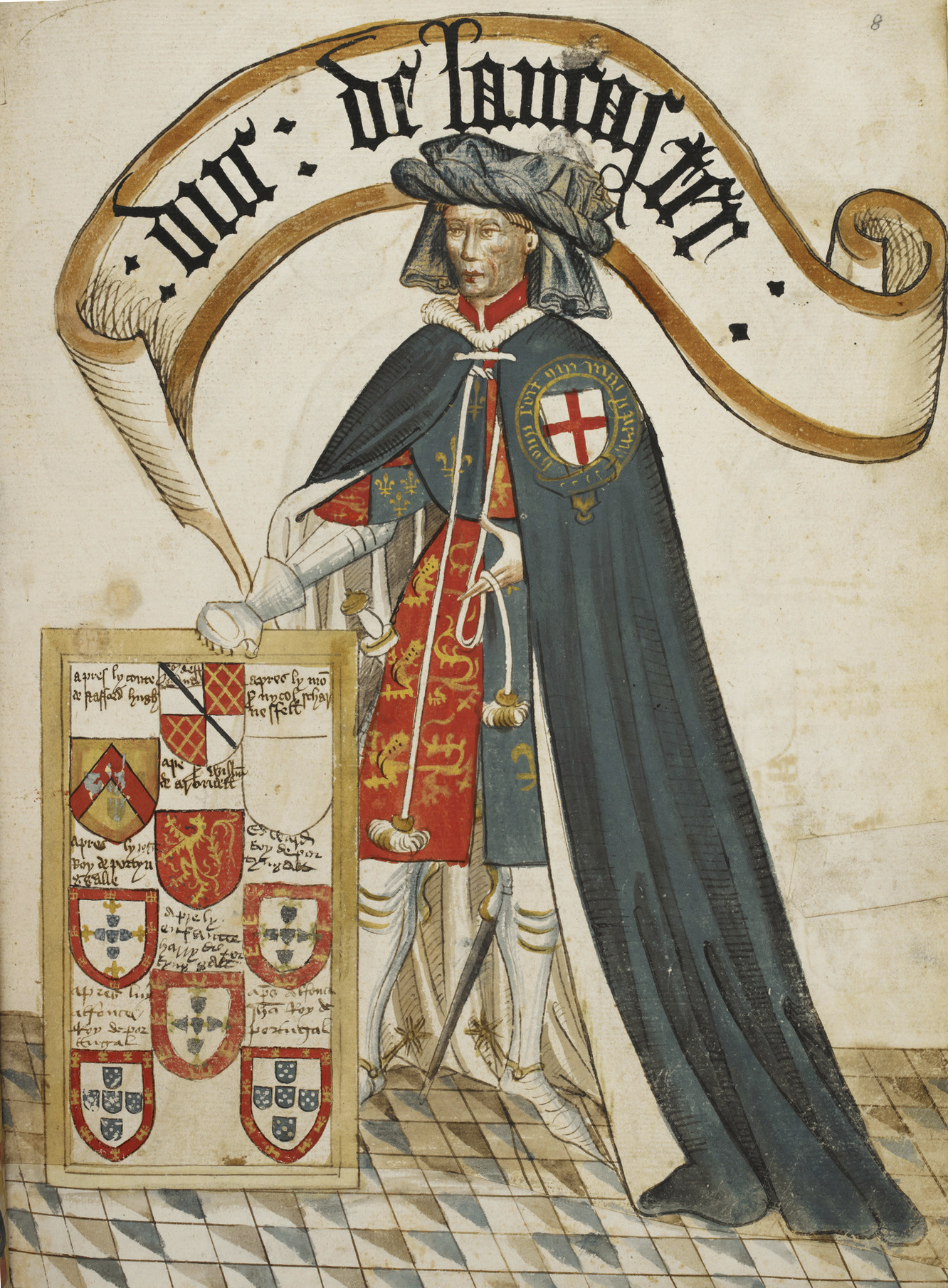
Henry of Lancaster, Earl of Derby

Derby's force embarked at Southampton at the end of May. Bad weather forced his fleet of 151 ships to shelter in Falmouth for several weeks en route, finally departing on 23 July. The Gascons, primed by Stafford to expect Derby's arrival in late May and sensing the French weakness, took the field without him. The Gascons captured the large, weakly garrisoned castles of Montravel and Monbreton on the Dordogne in early June; both were taken by surprise and their seizure broke the tenuous Truce of Malestroit. Stafford carried out a short march north to besiege Blaye with his advance party and perhaps 1,000 men-at-arms and 3,000 infantry of the Gascon lords. Having established the siege he left the Gascons to prosecute it and proceeded to Langon, south of Bordeaux, and set up a second siege. The Anglo-Gascon forces at both sieges could be readily supplied by ship. The French issued an urgent call to arms.

Meanwhile, small independent parties of Gascons raided across the region. Local French groups joined them, and several minor nobles threw in their lot with the Anglo-Gascons. They had some successes, but their main effect was to tie down most of the weak French garrisons in the region and to cause them to call for reinforcements. The few French troops in the region not garrisoning their fortifications immobilised themselves with sieges: of Casseneuil in the Agenais; Monchamp near Condom; and Montcuq, a strong but strategically insignificant castle south of Bergerac. Large areas were effectively undefended.

Edward's main army sailed on 29 June. They anchored off Sluys in Flanders until 22 July, while Edward attended to diplomatic affairs. When they sailed, probably intending to land in Normandy, they were scattered by a storm and found their way to English ports over the following week. After more than five weeks on board ship the men and horses had to be disembarked. There was a further week's delay while the King and his council debated what to do, by which time it proved impossible to take any action with the main English army before winter. Aware of this, Philip despatched reinforcements to Brittany and Gascony. Peter, Duke of Bourbon was appointed commander-in-chief of the south-west front on 8 August.

=== Battles of Bergerac and Auberoche ===
On 9 August 1345 Derby arrived in Bordeaux with 500 men-at-arms, 1,500 English and Welsh archers, 500 of them mounted on ponies to increase their mobility, and ancillary and support troops, such as a team of 24 miners. A high proportion of the archers and some of the men-at-arms were convicted felons promised pardons if they served for the duration of the campaign, but the majority, including many of the felons, were veterans of other campaigns. After two weeks of further recruiting and organising Derby marched his army to Langon, rendezvoused with Stafford and took command of the combined force. While Stafford had to this point pursued a cautious strategy, Derby's intention was quite different. Rather than continue a war of sieges he was determined to strike directly at the French before they could concentrate their forces. The French forces in the region were under Bertrand de l'Isle-Jourdain, since the Duke of Bourbon had not yet arrived. Hearing of Derby's arrival, he decided to fall back to the communications centre and strategically important town of Bergerac, 60 mi (97 km) east of Bordeaux, where there was an important bridge over the Dordogne River. This was a convenient place to concentrate French forces and assimilate reinforcements.

After a council of war Derby decided to strike at the French at Bergerac. The capture of the town, which had good river supply links to Bordeaux, would provide the Anglo-Gascon army with a base from which to carry the war to the French. It would also force the lifting of the siege of the nearby castle of Montcuq and sever communications between French forces north and south of the Dordogne. The English believed that the town could be easily taken if the French field army could be beaten or distracted. After eight years of defensive warfare by the Anglo-Gascons, there was no expectation among the French that they might make any offensive moves.

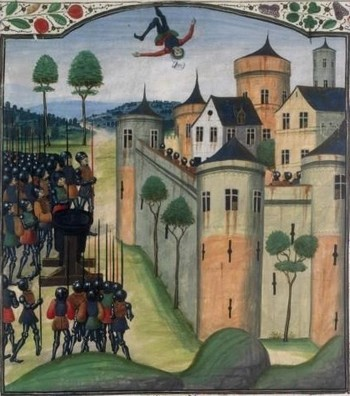
Miniature from Froissart's Chronicle illustrating his fanciful account of a messenger from Auberoche being fired back into the castle by a trebuchet.

Derby moved rapidly and took the French army at Bergerac by surprise on 26 August, decisively beating them in a running battle. The exact details of the battle are confused and there are contradictions between the original sources, which is reflected in the modern accounts. Clifford Rogers provides a summary of the contemporary accounts, their discrepancies, and the treatment of these by modern historians. In any event, French casualties were heavy, many being killed or captured. Prisoners included Henri de Montigny, Seneschal of Périgord, ten other senior noblemen and many lesser nobles. Derby's share of the ransoms and the loot was estimated at £34,000 (£41,000,000 in 2025 terms (Note: UK Consumer Price Index inflation figures from 1209–2024 based on data from "Inflation calculator". Bank of England. London. 18 February 2026.)), approximately four times the annual income from his lands. (Note: For comparison, Edward III's annual income was often less than £50,000.) The survivors of the French field army rallied around de l'Isle and retreated north to Périgueux. Within days of the battle, Bergerac fell to an Anglo-Gascon assault and was subsequently sacked. Strategically, the Anglo-Gascon army had secured an important base for further operations. Politically, local lords who had been undecided in their allegiance had been shown that the English were again a force to be reckoned with.

Derby consolidated and reorganised for two weeks, left a large garrison in the town and moved north to the Anglo-Gascon stronghold of Mussidan in the Isle valley with 6,000–8,000 men. He then pushed west to Périgueux, the provincial capital of Périgord, taking several strongpoints on the way. Périgueux's defences were antiquated and derelict, but the size of the French force defending it prohibited an assault. Derby blockaded Périgueux and captured strongholds blocking the main routes into the city. John, Duke of Normandy, the son and heir of Philip VI, replaced the Duke of Bourbon, gathered an army reportedly numbering over 20,000 and manoeuvred in the area. In early October a very large detachment relieved the city and drove off Derby's force, which withdrew towards Bordeaux. Further reinforced, the French started besieging the English-held strongpoints. A French force of 7,000, commanded by Louis of Poitiers, besieged the castle of Auberoche, 9 mi (14 km) east of Périgueux. Auberoche perches on a rocky promontory completely commanding the River Auvézère. The French encampment was divided in two, the majority of the soldiers camped close to the river between the castle and village while a smaller force was situated to prevent any relief attempts from the north. The chronicler Froissart tells an improbable tale that a soldier attempting to reach the English lines with a letter requesting help was captured and returned to the castle via a trebuchet. A messenger did get through to Derby, who was already returning to the area with a scratch force of 1,200 English and Gascon soldiers: 400 men-at-arms and 800 mounted archers.

After a night march Derby attacked the French camp on 21 October while they were at dinner, taking them by surprise and causing heavy initial casualties. The French rallied and there was a protracted hand-to-hand struggle, which ended when the commander of the small English garrison in the castle sortied and fell upon the rear of the French. They broke and fled. Derby's mounted men-at-arms pursued them relentlessly. French casualties are uncertain, but were heavy. They are described by modern historians as "appalling", "extremely high", "staggering", and "heavy". Many French nobles were taken prisoner; lower ranking men were, as was customary, put to the sword. The French commander, Louis of Poitiers, died of his wounds. Surviving prisoners included the second in command, Bertrand de l'Isle-Jourdain, two counts, seven viscounts, three barons, the seneschals of Clermont and Toulouse, a nephew of the Pope and so many knights that they were not counted. The ransoms alone made a fortune for many of the soldiers in Derby's army, as well as Derby himself, who was said to have made at least £50,000 (£60,000,000 in 2025 terms) from the day's captives. Over the following year Philip paid large amounts from the royal treasury as contributions towards the captives' ransoms.

=== Exploitation ===
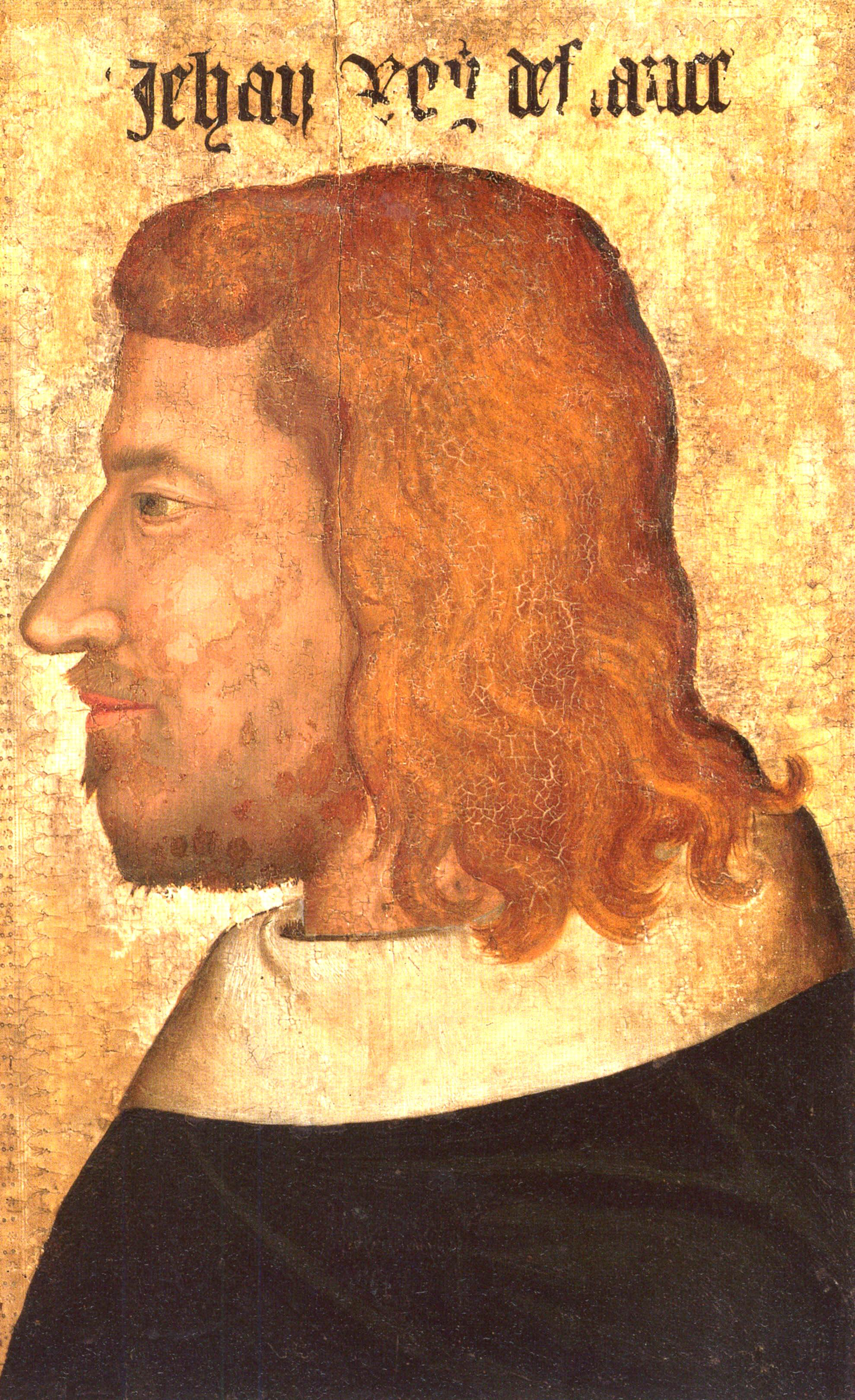
A contemporary portrait of the Duke of Normandy (later King of France)

The Duke of Normandy lost heart on hearing of the defeat. There are accounts that he resigned his command and returned to Paris, only to be reinstated and sent back by his father, the King. The French abandoned all of their ongoing sieges of other Anglo-Gascon strongpoints. There were reports of the French army disintegrating: men unpaid, even unfed; lack of fodder for the horses; desertion; troops selling their equipment. Despite heavily outnumbering the Anglo-Gascon force the Duke of Normandy retreated to Angoulême and disbanded his army, possibly because the French had run out of funds. Derby was left almost completely unopposed for five months.

Derby moved south after his victory, falling back on his communications as winter weather was setting in. He started clearing French fortifications from the border of English territory: the small castle at Pellegrue surrendered; that at Monségur was stormed. He then moved on the large, strongly fortified town of La Réole. This occupied a key position on the north bank of the Garonne river, only 35 miles (56 km) from Bordeaux. The town had been English until captured by the French twenty-one years earlier. It had enjoyed considerable autonomy and lucrative trading privileges, which it had lost under the French. After negotiations with Derby, on 8 November the citizens distracted the large French garrison and opened a gate for the English. The garrison fled to the citadel, which was considered exceptionally strong; the English proceeded to mine it. The garrison agreed a provisional surrender; if they were not relieved within five weeks they would leave. They were allowed to communicate this to the Duke of Normandy, but as he had just disbanded his army, and it was anyway mid-winter, there was little he could do. In early January 1346 the garrison left and the English replaced them. The town regained its previous privileges. Derby spent the rest of the winter there.

While this was happening the main Gascon forces disbanded. Many of the English soldiers took ship for home. After the main forces had gone home for the winter, small groups of Anglo-Gascons remained active. They cleared the valley of the Garonne downstream of La Réole of French presence, and raided the poorly fortified towns and weakly garrisoned French castles and smaller fortifications within their reach. Langon, which had resisted Stafford in the summer, was taken. Frequently Derby negotiated trade concessions or privileges with towns, or reinstated previous ones, to encourage them to open their gates to the English forces. The towns could more readily participate in the lucrative export trade through Bordeaux if under English rule, and Derby's performance lessened their fear of French retribution. Derby had considerable success with this approach, which also allowed the towns to avoid the possible dangers of a siege or sack. The citizens of several French garrisoned towns persuaded the soldiers to withdraw, so that they could pre-emptively surrender to Derby. In at least one case they seized the French soldiers in their beds and expelled them. A letter from a committee of French garrison commanders sent to Philip VI in November claimed that towns were defecting to the English on a "daily" basis, and to Anglo-Gascon forces of trivial size. The French defenders were thoroughly demoralised.

The Duke of Bourbon, the newly-appointed French Seneschal of Gascony, unexpectedly found himself under assault. Stafford marched on the vitally important town of Aiguillon, which commanded the junction of the Rivers Garonne and Lot, "the key to Gascony", in late November. The inhabitants attacked the garrison and opened the gates to the English. By March 1346 almost the entire province of Agenais was in English hands. Bourbon held only Agen, the capital, and four castles; all were blockaded by the English. Morale was not good. As Bourbon started to assemble a new army at Agen, fights broke out with the townsfolk. Several Italian mercenaries were lynched. Since the start of the campaign the English had captured over 100 towns and castles.

== Assessment ==
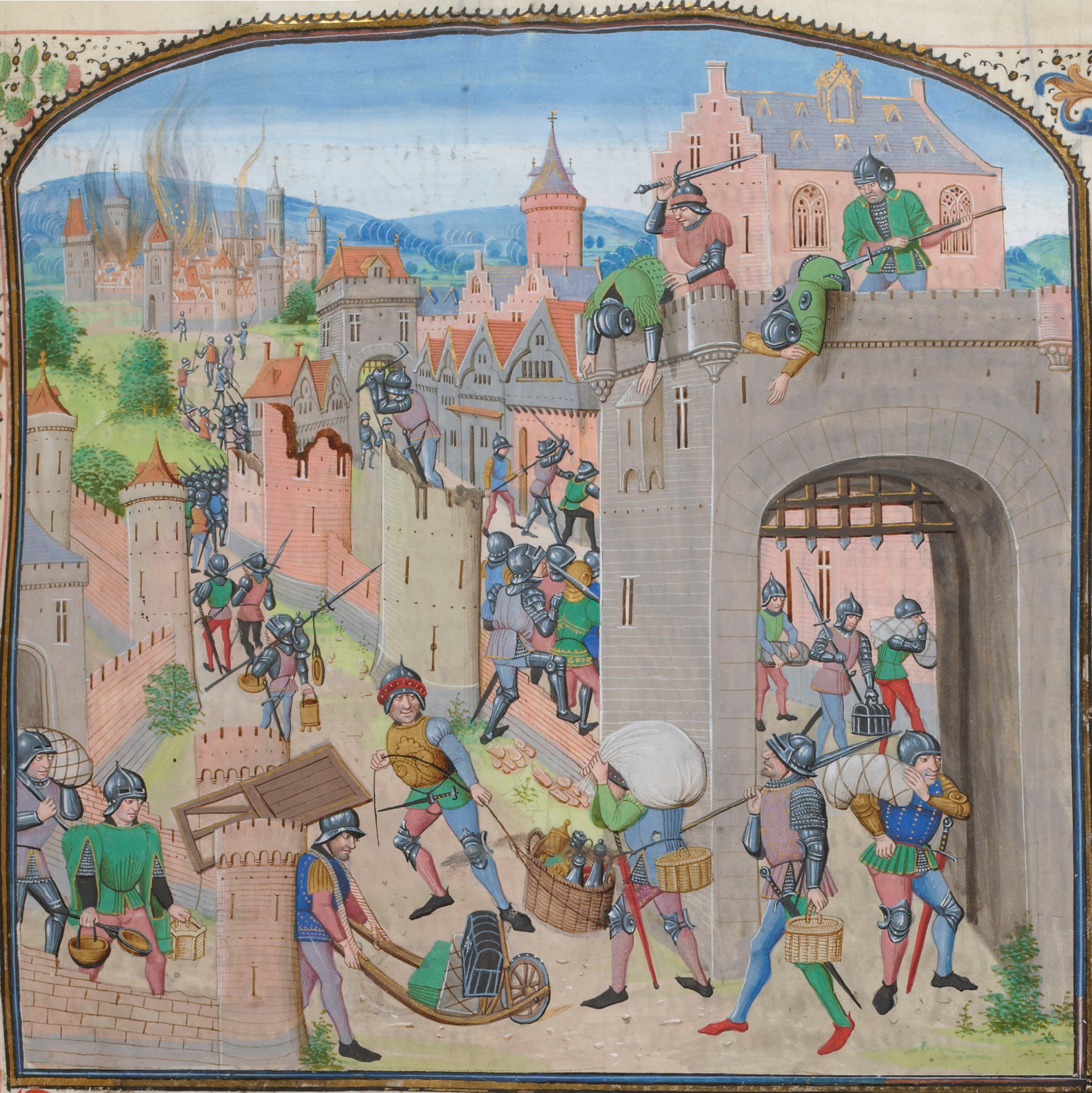
A town being sacked

The campaign had been a disaster for the French, the worse for being unexpected; during the previous eight years of the war, the Anglo-Gascons had made no large-scale offensive moves. They had lost towns and castles; suffered heavy casualties; and had many nobles taken prisoner, who would not be available to fight until they had paid their heavy ransoms, much of which would go to fund the English war effort. Towns throughout south-west France embarked on urgent and expensive programmes to repair, improve or in some cases build from scratch their fortifications. They also paid attention to keeping them adequately garrisoned. It became next to impossible to raise tax money from the region, or to persuade men to serve away from home. This extended to areas far from where Derby had campaigned.

After two and a half years of uneasy peace, the war had restarted with a series of French humiliations. In the border region morale and, more importantly, prestige had decidedly swung England's way following this campaign, providing an influx of taxes and recruits for the English armies. Large parts of the Gascon nobility had been wavering with regard to committing themselves, and Derby's victories tipped the balance for many. Local lords of note declared for the English, bringing their retinues with them. Derby's success was essentially defensive: he had secured Gascony. He had also set the scene for a possible future Anglo-Gascon offensive; this was to come late the following year, with his series of mounted raids. For the time being, while French financial resources were hampered, their ability to raise and project large forces were not seriously impaired.

The four-month campaign has been described as "the first successful land campaign of ... the Hundred Years' War", which had commenced more than eight years earlier. Derby (Note: During the 1345 campaign he was known as the Earl of Derby, but his father died in September 1345 and he became the Earl of Lancaster. Sumption 1990, p. 476) went on to lead another successful campaign in 1346. Modern historians have praised the generalship demonstrated by Derby in this campaign: "superb and innovative tactician"; "ris[ing] to the level of genius"; "brilliant in the extreme"; "stunning"; "brilliant". A chronicler writing fifty years after the event described him as "one of the best warriors in the world".

== Aftermath ==
In October 1345 Northampton commenced his campaign in northern Brittany, but it fizzled out in a series of failures to capture French-held Breton towns. The French decided to make their main effort in 1346 against Gascony. A large French army, "enormously superior" to any force Derby could field, assembled early in the campaigning season under the Duke of Normandy and marched up the Garonne valley. Their plan was to retake La Réole; to ensure their lines of supply they first had to retake Aiguillon. Stafford, in charge of Aiguillon's Anglo-Gascon garrison of 900 men, withstood an eight-month siege. Derby concentrated the main Anglo-Gascon force at La Réole, as a threat, and ensured that the French were never able to fully blockade the town. They found that their own supply lines were seriously harassed.

Edward III was meanwhile assembling a large army in England. The French were aware of this, but anticipated that it would sail to Gascony and attempt to relieve Aiguillon. Instead it landed in Normandy in July, achieving strategic surprise and starting the Crécy campaign. Philip VI ordered his son to abandon the siege and march north; after several delays John did, arriving in Picardy two weeks after Philip's army had been decisively beaten at the Battle of Crécy with very heavy losses. The areas facing Derby were left effectively defenceless, and he sent local Gascon forces to besiege the few major strongholds in the region still held by the French. Taking a force of approximately 2,000 Derby set out from La Réole on a grand chevauchée, a great mounted raid. During the following two months this was devastatingly successful. Not only Gascony, but much of the Duchy of Aquitaine was left securely in English hands. It was to be held until formally ceded by the French in 1360 in the Treaty of Brétigny.

== Notes, citations and sources ==
=== Sources ===
- Burne, Alfred (1999). The Crecy War. Ware, Hertfordshire: Wordsworth Editions. ISBN 978-1-84022-210-4.
- Crowcroft, Robert; Cannon, John (2015). "Gascony". The Oxford Companion to British History. Oxford: Oxford University Press. p. 389. ISBN 978-0-19-967783-2.
- DeVries, Kelly (1996). Infantry Warfare in the Early Fourteenth Century: Discipline, Tactics, and Technology. Woodbridge, UK: Boydell Press. ISBN 978-0-85115-567-8.
- Fowler, Kenneth (1961). Henry of Grosmont, First Duke of Lancaster, 1310–1361 (PDF) (PhD thesis). Leeds: University of Leeds.
- Fowler, Kenneth Alan (1969). The King's Lieutenant: Henry of Grosmont, First Duke of Lancaster, 1310–1361. New York: Barnes & Noble. ISBN 978-0-389-01003-6. OCLC 164491035.
- Gribit, Nicholas (2016). Henry of Lancaster's Expedition to Aquitaine 1345–46. Woodbridge, Suffolk: Boydell Press. ISBN 978-1-78327-117-7.
- Guizot, François (1870s). "Chapter XX. The Hundred Years' War – Philip VI and John II". A Popular History of France from the Earliest Times. Translated by Robert Black. Boston: D. Estes and C.E. Lauriat. OCLC 916066180.
- Harris, Robin (1994). Valois Guyenne. Royal Historical Society Studies in History. Vol. 71. London: Boydell Press. ISBN 978-0-86193-226-9.
- King, Andy (2002). "According to the Custom Used in French and Scottish Wars: Prisoners and Casualties on the Scottish Marches in the Fourteenth Century". Journal of Medieval History. 28 (3): 263–290. doi:10.1016/S0048-721X(02)00057-X. ISSN 0304-4181. S2CID 159873083.
- Lucas, Henry S. (1929). The Low Countries and the Hundred Years' War: 1326–1347. Ann Arbor: University of Michigan Press. OCLC 960872598.
- Oman, Charles (1998) [1924]. A History of the Art of War in the Middle Ages: 1278–1485 A.D. London: Greenhill Books. ISBN 978-1-85367-332-0.
- Prestwich, M. (2007). J.M. Roberts (ed.). Plantagenet England 1225–1360. Oxford: Oxford University Press. ISBN 978-0-19-922687-0.
- Rodger, N.A.M. (2004). The Safeguard of the Sea. London: Penguin. ISBN 978-0-14-029724-9.
- Rogers, Clifford (2004). "The Bergerac Campaign (1345) and the Generalship of Henry of Lancaster". Journal of Medieval Military History. II. Woodbridge, Suffolk: Boydell Press: 89–110. ISBN 978-1-84383-040-5. ISSN 0961-7582.
- Sumption, Jonathan (1990). Trial by Battle. The Hundred Years' War. Vol. I. London: Faber and Faber. ISBN 978-0-571-20095-5.
- Vale, Malcolm (1999). "The War in Aquitaine". In Curry, Anne; Hughes, Michael (eds.). Arms, Armies and Fortifications in the Hundred Years War. Woodbridge, Suffolk: Boydell & Brewer. pp. 69–82. ISBN 978-0-85115-755-9.
- Wagner, John A. (2006). "Auberoche, Battle of (1345)". Encyclopedia of the Hundred Years War. Woodbridge, Suffolk: Greenwood. pp. 35–36. ISBN 978-0-313-32736-0.
