= Henri de Montigny =

14th-century French noble

Henri de Montigny, Seneschal of Périgord, was a 14th century French noble.

== Life ==
During the English Gascon campaign of 1345, Montigny led a French force at the town of Bergerac. The Anglo-Gascon army commanded by Henry, Earl of Derby marched towards Bergerac, where they fought the French forces on the road to Bergerac. The French suffered heavy casualties and the loss of Bergerac. Montigny was captured along with ten other noblemen and a large number of lesser nobles.
