= Battle of Bergerac =

Battle during the Hundred Years' War

- Part of the Gascon campaign of the Hundred Years' War
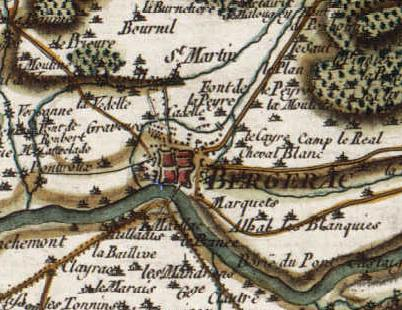
- 18th-century map showing Bergerac within its defences, and the bridge and suburbs south of the Dordogne
Date	Late August 1345
Location	Bergerac, France 44°51′34″N 00°28′59″E
Result	Anglo-Gascon victory

Belligerents
Kingdom of England	Kingdom of France

Commanders and leaders
Henry of Grosmont, Earl of Derby	Henri de Montigny, Seneshal of Périgord (POW)

Strength
1,200 men-at-arms (of whom 700 were Gascons); 1,500 English longbowmen 2,800 Gascon infantry	1,600 men-at-arms Large number of infantry

Casualties and losses
Very light	Over 600 men-at-arms killed; many captured Large number of infantry killed
- Location within France

The Battle of Bergerac was fought between Anglo-Gascon and French forces at the town of Bergerac, Gascony, in August 1345 during the Hundred Years' War. In early 1345 Edward III of England decided to launch a major attack on the French from the north, while sending smaller forces to Brittany and Gascony, the latter being both economically important to the English war effort and the proximate cause of the war. The French focused on the threat to northern France, leaving comparatively small forces in the south-west.

Henry of Grosmont, Earl of Derby, arrived in Gascony in August and, breaking with the previous policy of cautious advance, struck directly at the largest French concentration, at Bergerac. He surprised and defeated the French forces under Bertrand I of L'Isle-Jourdain and Henri de Montigny. The French suffered heavy casualties and the loss of the town, a significant strategic setback. Along with the Battle of Auberoche later in the year, it marked a change in the military balance of power in the region. It was the first of a series of victories which would lead to Henry of Derby being called "one of the best warriors in the world" by a contemporary chronicler.

== Gascony ==
France in 1330 Under French royal control in 1214 Gained from English control by 1330 England and English-controlled Gascony in 1330

Since the Norman Conquest of 1066, English monarchs had held titles and lands within France, the possession of which made them vassals of the kings of France. The French began re-taking these lands from the English in the late 12th century; by 1337 only Gascony in south-western France and Ponthieu in northern France were left. The Gascons preferred their relationship with a distant English king who left them alone to one with a French king who would interfere in their affairs. Following a series of disagreements between Philip VI of France and Edward III of England, on 24 May 1337 Philip's Great Council in Paris agreed that the Duchy of Aquitaine, effectively Gascony, should be taken back into Philip's hands on the grounds that Edward was in breach of his obligations as a vassal. This marked the start of the Hundred Years' War, which was to last 116 years.

Before the war commenced at least 1,000 ships a year departed Gascony. Among their cargoes were over 80,000 tuns of wine. (Note: The tun was a wine cask used as a standard measure, and contained 252 gallons (954 litres) of wine. 80 thousand tuns of wine equates to 76,320,000 litres (16,790,000 imperial gallons; 20,160,000 US gallons)) The duty levied by the English Crown on wine from Bordeaux, the capital of Gascony, was more than all other customs duties combined and by far the largest source of state income. Bordeaux had a population of over 50,000, greater than London's, and Bordeaux was possibly richer. However, by this time English Gascony had become so truncated by French encroachments that it relied on imports of food, largely from England. Any interruptions to regular shipping were liable to starve Gascony and financially cripple England; the French were well aware of this. Although Gascony was the cause of the war, Edward was able to spare few resources for it, and previously when an English army had campaigned on the continent it had operated in northern France. In most campaigning seasons the Gascons had had to rely on their own resources and had been hard pressed by the French. In 1339 the French besieged Bordeaux, the capital of Gascony, even breaking into the city with a large force before they were repulsed. Typically the Gascons could field 3,000–6,000 men, the large majority infantry, although up to two-thirds of them would be tied down in garrisons.

The border between English and French territory in Gascony was extremely unclear. Many landholders owned a patchwork of widely separated estates, perhaps owing fealty to a different overlord for each. Each small estate was likely to have a fortified tower or keep, with larger estates having castles. Fortifications were also constructed at transport choke points, to collect tolls and to restrict military passage; fortified towns grew up alongside all bridges and most fords over the many rivers in the region. Military forces could support themselves by foraging so long as they moved on at frequent intervals. If they wished to remain in one place for any length of time, as was necessary to besiege a castle, then access to water transport was essential for supplies of food and fodder and desirable for such items as siege equipment. Warfare was usually a struggle for possession of castles and other fortified points, and for the mutable loyalty of the local nobility; the region had been in a state of flux for centuries and many local lords served whichever country was stronger, regardless of national ties.

By 1345, after eight years of war, English-controlled territory mostly consisted of a coastal strip from Bordeaux to Bayonne, with isolated strongholds further inland. The French had strong fortifications throughout what had once been English-controlled Gascony. Several directly threatened Bordeaux: Libourne, 20 miles (32 km) to the east allowed French armies to assemble a day's march from Bordeaux; the strongly fortified town of Blaye was situated on the north bank of the Gironde only 25 miles (40 km) downstream of Bordeaux and in a position to interdict its vital seaborne communications; the fortress of Langon, 30 miles (48 km) south of Bordeaux, blocked upstream communication along the Garonne, and facilitated the supply of any French force advancing on Bordeaux.

== Plans ==
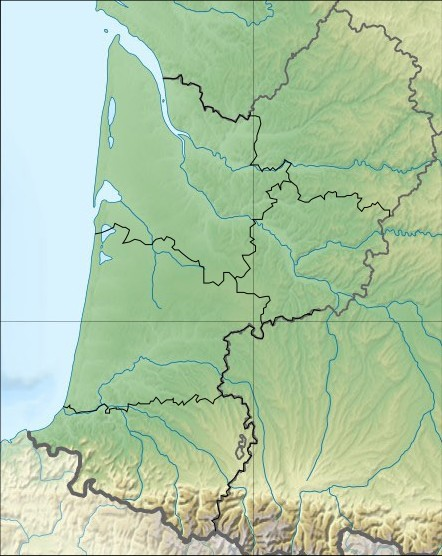
Location of Bergerac in modern Nouvelle-Aquitaine, and other places named in the text

Nouvelle-Aquitaine within modern France

Edward determined early in 1345 to attack France on three fronts. The Earl of Northampton would lead a small force to Brittany, a slightly larger force would proceed to Gascony under the command of Henry, Earl of Derby and the main force would accompany Edward to France or Flanders. The previous Seneschal of Gascony, Nicholas de la Beche, was replaced by the more senior Ralph, Earl of Stafford, who sailed for Gascony in February with an advance force. Derby was appointed the King's Lieutenant in Gascony on 13 March 1345 and received a contract to raise a force of 2,000 men in England, and further troops in Gascony itself. The highly detailed contract of indenture had a term of six months from the opening of the campaign in Gascony, with an option for Edward III to extend it for a further six-month on the same terms. Derby was given a high degree of autonomy, for example his strategic instructions were: "si guerre soit, et a faire le bien q'il poet" (if there is war, do the best you can).

In early 1345 the French decided to stand on the defensive in the south-west. Their intelligence correctly predicted English offensives in the three theatres, but they did not have the money to raise a significant army in each. They anticipated, correctly, that the English planned to make their main effort in northern France. Thus, they directed what resources they had to there, planning to assemble their main army at Arras on 22 July. South-western France was encouraged to rely on its own resources, but as the Truce of Malestroit, signed in early 1343, was still in effect, the local lords were reluctant to spend money, and little was done.

== Prelude ==
Derby's force embarked at Southampton at the end of May. Due to bad weather, his fleet of 151 ships was forced to shelter in Falmouth for several weeks en route, finally departing on 23 July. The Gascons, primed by Stafford to expect Derby's arrival in late May and sensing the French weakness, took the field without him. The Gascons captured the large, weakly garrisoned castles of Montravel and Monbreton on the Dordogne in early June; both were taken by surprise and their seizure broke the tenuous Truce of Malestroit. Stafford made a short advance north to besiege Blaye with his advance party and perhaps 1,000 men-at-arms and 3,000 infantry of the Gascon lords. Having established the siege, he left the Gascons to prosecute it and proceeded to Langon, south of Bordeaux, and set up a second siege. The Anglo-Gascon forces at both sieges could be readily supplied by ship. The French issued an urgent call to arms.

Meanwhile, small independent parties of Gascons raided across the region. A number of local French groups joined them, and several minor nobles threw in their lot with the Anglo-Gascons. They had several significant successes, but their main effect was to tie down most of the weak French garrisons in the region and to cause them to call for reinforcements. The few mobile French troops in the region immobilised themselves with sieges: of Casseneuil in the Agenais; Monchamp near Condom; and Montcuq, a strong but strategically insignificant castle south of Bergerac. Large areas were effectively undefended.

Edward III's main army sailed on 29 June. They anchored off Sluys in Flanders until 22 July, while Edward attended to diplomatic affairs. When they sailed, probably intending to land in Normandy, they were scattered by a storm and found their way to various English ports over the following week. After more than five weeks on board ship the men and horses had to be disembarked. There was a further week's delay while the King and his council debated what to do, by which time it proved impossible to take any action with the main English army before winter. Aware of this, Philip VI despatched reinforcements to Brittany and Gascony. Peter, Duke of Bourbon was appointed French commander in Gascony on 8 August and based himself at Agen.

On 9 August 1345 Derby arrived in Bordeaux with 500 men-at-arms, 500 mounted archers and 1,000 English and Welsh foot archers. After two weeks recruiting and organising Derby marched his force to Langon, rendezvoused with Stafford and took command of the combined force. Stafford had to this point pursued a cautious strategy of small-scale sieges. Derby's intention was quite different, rather than continue a cautious war of sieges he was determined to strike directly at the French main force before it was fully assembled. The French, hearing of Derby's arrival, concentrated their forces at the strategically important town of Bergerac, where there was an important bridge over the Dordogne, under the command of Bertrand de l'Isle-Jourdain. They would also be within reach of the French force under Henri de Montigny, Seneschal of Périgord, besieging nearby Montcuq. After a council of war Derby decided to attack the French here. The capture of the town, which had good river supply links to Bordeaux, would provide the Anglo-Gascon army with a base from which to carry the war to the French. It would also force the lifting of the siege of the nearby allied castle of Montcuq and sever communications between French forces north and south of the Dordogne. The English believed that if the French field army could be beaten or distracted the town could be easily taken.

== Battle ==
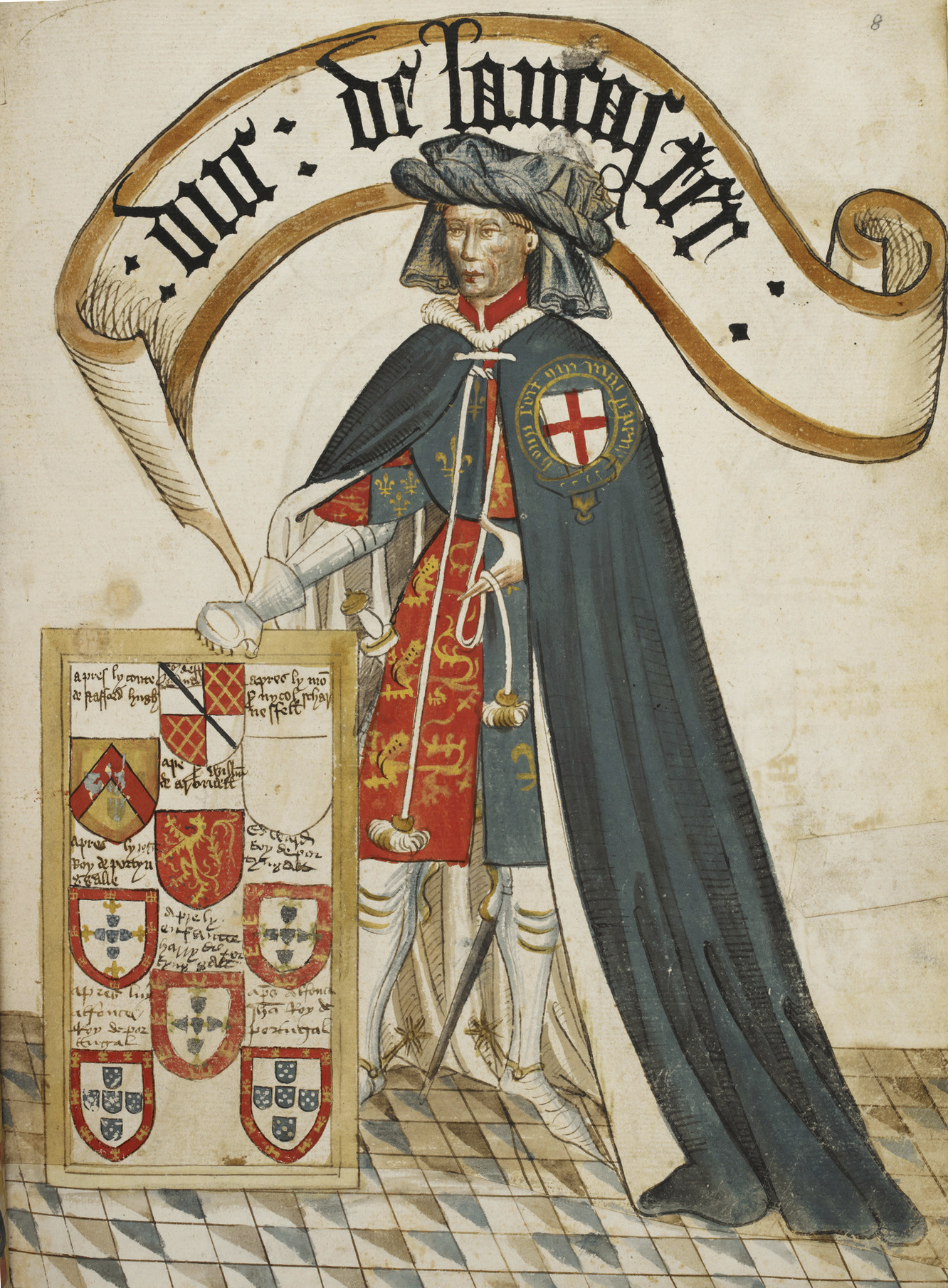
Henry of Grosmont, 1st Duke of Lancaster, Earl of Derby

Sometime in mid-August Derby marched from Langon with 1,200 men-at-arms, of whom 700 were Gascons, 1,500 longbowmen and 2,800 Gascon infantry. The French around Bergerac and Montcuq had 1,600 men-at-arms and a large but unspecified number of other troops. Derby's army moved fast and took the French forces by surprise. (Note: The exact details of the battle are confused and there is some contradiction in the original sources, which is reflected in the modern accounts. Where there are significant differences of interpretation, these have been noted. Rogers provides a summary of the contemporary accounts, their discrepancies, and the treatment of these by modern historians.) The exact date of the battle is unknown; A.H. Burne gives the fall of Bergerac as 26 August but holds that the battle took place some days before, while Kenneth Fowler gives the date of the fall of Bergerac as 24 August.

Exactly where the first part of the battle took place is also unknown. The modern historian Clifford Rogers makes the case for the road between St. Aubin-de-Langais and St. Nexans. Fowler believes it was on the road from Montcuq to Bergerac. The French, either lured from Bergerac by a ruse or in the process of withdrawing from their siege of Montcuq, or both, were caught on the road by the Anglo-Gascon army. They were subject to a barrage of English archery and struck by a charge by the Anglo-Gascon men-at-arms. The French were routed, and a running fight took place as they fled toward the St. Madeleine suburb of Bergerac, at the south end of the bridge. Because the pursuit was so close, it was impossible to close the gates on the barbican at the south end of the bridge and it was overrun. The pursuers pressed on to the bridge, which was 200 yards (180 m) long, narrow, and obstructed halfway along by a chapel. The garrison attempted to sortie to secure the barbican and the bridge became jammed with Frenchmen. English archers waded out to sandbanks in the river and enfiladed the panic-stricken French from both flanks. They "were killed in great numbers" and many surrendered to the Anglo-Gascons pressing close behind them. Attempts to drop the portcullis on the north end of the bridge were thwarted by a wounded horse falling in the gateway. The Anglo-Gascons pressed on to attack the town itself.

At this point, the contemporary sources differ. The two main chronicles covering the whole war, Froissart's The Chronicles of England, France and Spain and the St. Omer Chronicle, state that the gate was closed and that the town withstood a siege for several days, falling only after Derby had boats brought up-river to enable an attack on the weak riverside wall. A larger group of 14th-century sources, including the two which focus specifically on the war in Gascony, the Chronique de Guyenne and the Chronique de Brazas, state that the gate was carried by the first assault, on the same day as the battle, and after nightfall. There is other documentary evidence to support this opinion and it is generally accepted by modern historians, such as Rogers and Jonathan Sumption. In any event, whether several days later or on the evening of the battle, the town was captured and sacked, and a large amount of supplies and horses was captured. The surviving French from the field army which had been besieging Montcuq were gathered by John, Count of Armagnac, and retreated north to Périgueux.

== Aftermath ==
The battle and subsequent capture of Bergerac were major victories; the plunder from the defeated French army and from sacking the town was immense. Over 600 French men-at-arms were listed as killed, and a large number were captured. Losses among the French infantry are not recorded but were reported to have been heavy; as was customary, most of the common soldiers were killed, regardless of whether they were still bearing arms. Prisoners included Henri de Montingny, ten other noblemen and a large number of lesser nobles. Derby's share of the ransoms and the loot was estimated at £34,000 (£41,000,000 in 2025 terms (Note: UK Retail Price Index inflation figures are based on data from Clark, Gregory (2017). "The Annual RPI and Average Earnings for Britain, 1209 to Present (New Series)". MeasuringWorth. Retrieved 28 October 2018. To give a very rough idea of earning power, an English foot-soldier could expect to earn £1 in wages in approximately 3 months for, usually seasonal, military service; Edward III's annual income was often less than £50,000.)), approximately four times the annual income from his lands. English and Gascon losses were very light.

It was the first of a series of victories which would lead to Derby being called "one of the best warriors in the world" by a contemporary chronicler in Chroniques de quatres premier Valois and to modern historians praising his generalship as: "[a] superb and innovative tactician" (Rogers); "ris[ing] to the level of genius" (Rogers); "brilliant in the extreme" (Burne); "stunning" (Gribit). Modern historian Nicholas Gribit has described Derby's four-month campaign of 1345 as "the first successful land campaign of ... the Hundred Years' War".

Strategically, the Anglo-Gascon army had secured an important base for further operations. Politically, local lords who had been undecided in their allegiance had been shown that the English were again a force to be reckoned with in Gascony. Along with the Battle of Auberoche later in the year, it marked a change in the military balance of power in the region.

== Notes, citations and sources ==
=== Sources ===
- Burne, Alfred (1999). The Crecy War. Ware, Hertfordshire: Wordsworth Editions. ISBN 978-1-84022-210-4.
- Crowcroft, Robert & Cannon, John (2015). "Gascony". The Oxford Companion to British History. Oxford: Oxford University Press. p. 389. ISBN 978-0-19-967783-2.
- Curry, Anne (2002). The Hundred Years' War 1337–1453 (PDF). Oxford: Osprey Publishing. ISBN 978-1-84176-269-2. Archived from the original (PDF) on 27 September 2018.
- DeVries, Kelly (2006). Infantry Warfare in the Early Fourteenth Century: Discipline, Tactics, and Technology. Woodbridge, Suffolk; Rochester, NY: Boydell Press. ISBN 978-0-85115-571-5.
- Fowler, Kenneth (1961). Henry of Grosmont, First Duke of Lancaster, 1310–1361 (PDF) (PhD thesis). Leeds: University of Leeds.
- Fowler, Kenneth (1969). The King's Lieutenant: Henry of Grosmont, First Duke of Lancaster 1310–1361. London: Elek. OCLC 22977660.
- Gribit, Nicholas (2016). Henry of Lancaster's Expedition to Aquitaine 1345–46. Woodbridge, Suffolk: Boydell Press. ISBN 978-1-78327-117-7.
- Harris, Robin (1994). Valois Guyenne. Royal Historical Society Studies in History. Vol. 71. London: Boydell Press. ISBN 978-0861932269.
- King, Andy (2002). "According to the Custom Used in French and Scottish Wars: Prisoners and Casualties on the Scottish Marches in the Fourteenth Century". Journal of Medieval History. 28 (3): 263–290. doi:10.1016/S0048-721X(02)00057-X. ISSN 0304-4181. S2CID 159873083.
- Lucas, Henry S. (1929). The Low Countries and the Hundred Years' War: 1326–1347. Ann Arbor: University of Michigan Press. OCLC 960872598.
- Prestwich, M. (2007). J.M. Roberts (ed.). Plantagenet England 1225–1360. Oxford: Oxford University Press. ISBN 978-0-19-922687-0.
- Rodger, N.A.M. (2004). The Safeguard of the Sea. London: Penguin. ISBN 978-0-14-029724-9.
- Rogers, Clifford (2004). Bachrach, Bernard S; DeVries, Kelly; Rogers, Clifford J (eds.). "The Bergerac Campaign (1345) and the Generalship of Henry of Lancaster". Journal of Medieval Military History. II. Woodbridge, Suffolk: Boydell Press: 89–110. ISBN 978-1-84383-040-5. ISSN 0961-7582.
- Sumption, Jonathan (1990). Trial by Battle. London: Faber and Faber. ISBN 978-0-571-20095-5.
- Vale, Malcolm (1999). "The War in Aquitaine". In Curry, Anne & Hughes, Michael (eds.). Arms, Armies and Fortifications in the Hundred Years War. Woodbridge, Suffolk: Boydell & Brewer. pp. 69–82. ISBN 978-0-85115-755-9.
- Wagner, John A. (2006). "Bergerac, Battle of (1345)". Encyclopedia of the Hundred Years War. Woodbridge, Suffolk: Greenwood. pp. 51–52. ISBN 978-0-313-32736-0.
