= John Cannon (historian) =

English historian

John Ashton Cannon CBE FRSA (8 October 1926 – 25 October 2012) was an English historian specialising in 18th-century British politics.

Cannon was born in Hertfordshire. He was educated at Hertford Grammar School where he gained a scholarship to Peterhouse, Cambridge, and gained his PhD at Bristol University (where he was appointed Lecturer in 1961 and Senior Lecturer in 1967 as well as Reader in 1970). During his time at Bristol, he also became involved in Radio Bristol when it was first aired and was chairman from 1970 to 1974.

In 1976 he was appointed Chairman of Modern History at the University of Newcastle-upon-Tyne and Dean of the Faculty of Arts in 1979. He was Pro Vice Chancellor from 1983 to 1986 and was also employed by the History of Parliament Trust. In recognition of his contribution to Education, he was appointed a CBE in 1985. He was vice-chairman of the University Grants Committee in the period till its abolition in 1990.

His edition of Junius's Letters has been described by Junius' entry in the Oxford Dictionary of National Biography as the most "authoritative collection".

Cannon died in Newcastle upon Tyne in October 2012.

== Works ==
- The Fox-North Coalition. Crisis of the Constitution, 1782–4 (1969).
- Parliamentary Reform, 1640-1832 (1973).
- The Letters of Junius (editor, 1978).
- The Historian at Work (editor, 1980).
- The Whig Ascendancy. Colloquies on Hanoverian Britain (editor, 1981).
- 'The Isthmus Repaired: The Resurgence of the English Aristocracy, 1660-1760’, Proceedings of the British Academy 68 (1982), pp. 431–53.
- Aristocratic Century. The Peerage of Eighteenth-Century England (1984).
- The Blackwell Dictionary of Historians (editor amongst others, 1988).
- The Oxford Companion to British History (editor, 1997 First Edition)
- The Oxford Illustrated History of the British Monarchy (with Ralph Griffiths, 1988; 2nd edn, 2000).
- The Kings and Queens of Britain (with Anne Hargreaves, 2001; 2nd edn, 2009).
- The Oxford Companion to British History (editor, 2002, Revised First Edition)
- The Oxford Companion to British History (editor, 2009, On-line publication with corrections)
- A Dictionary of British History (editor, 2004; Second Edition, 2009).
- The Oxford Companion to British History (co-editor with Robert Crowcroft, 2015, Second Edition)
- Schooling in England – A Noiseless Revolution? (Edited by Professor Richard Hoyle, List & Indexes Society, 2017)
