= Kelly DeVries =

American historian (born 1956)

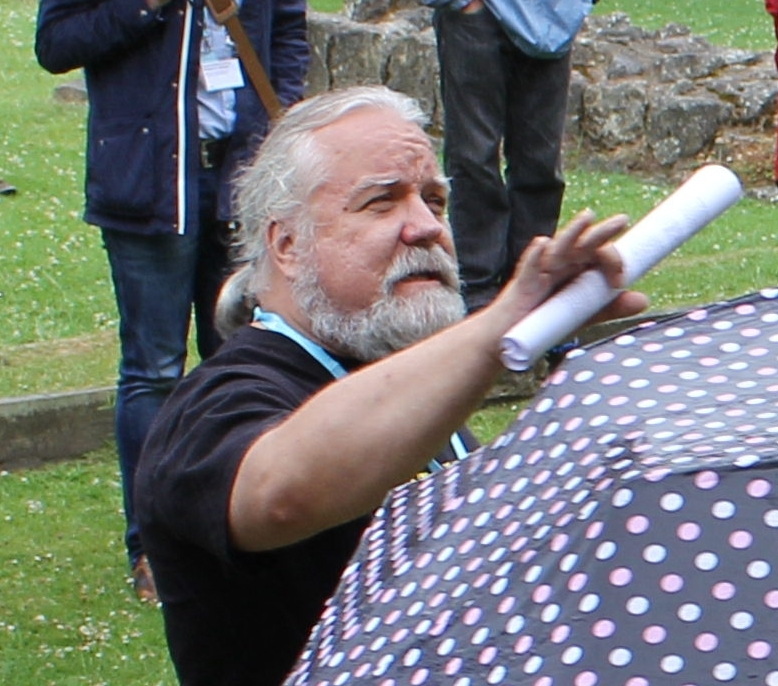
- DeVries in 2015
- Born: December 23, 1956 (age 69); Provo, Utah, U.S.
- Education: University of Toronto (PhD)
- Occupations: Medievalist, military historian
- Writing career
- Subject: Medieval warfare

Kelly Robert DeVries (born December 23, 1956) is an American medievalist and military historian specializing in the warfare of the Middle Ages. He is often featured as an expert commentator on television documentaries. He is professor of history at Loyola University Maryland and Honorary Historical Consultant at the Royal Armouries, UK.

== Education ==
DeVries received his PhD in medieval studies in 1987 from the Centre for Medieval Studies at the University of Toronto.

== Awards ==
DeVries with co-editor Michael Livingston was named as one of the recipients of the 2017 Distinguished Book Award from the Society for Military History for their book The Battle of Crécy: A Casebook. A second Distinguished Book Award from the Society for Military History was shared in 2020 by the two for Medieval Warfare: A Reader.

== Selected works ==
- (1992) Medieval Military Technology Broadview Press.
- (1999) Joan of Arc: A Military Leader Gloucestershire: Sutton Publishing, ISBN 0-7509-1805-5 OCLC 42957383
- (1999) The Norwegian Invasion of England in 1066 Boydell Press, ISBN 1-84383-027-2.
- (1996) Infantry Warfare in the Early Fourteenth Century Boydell Press. ISBN 0851155677 OCLC 34356019
- Guns and Men in Medieval Europe
- (2002) A Cumulative Bibliography of Medieval Military History and Technology History of Warfare, Vol. 8, Brill Press.
- (2005) A Cumulative Bibliography of Medieval Military History and Technology: Update 2004 History of Warfare, Vol. 26, Brill Press (winner of the Verbruggen Prize)
- "The Lack of a Western European Military Response to the Ottoman Invasions of Eastern Europe from Nicopolis (1396) to Mohács (1526)". Medieval Warfare 1300–1450. London: Routledge. 2010. pp. 539–559. ISBN 9781315249230.

=== Collaborations ===
- with Matthew Bennett, Jim Bradbury, Ian Dickie and Phyllis Jestice: (2005) Fighting Techniques of the Medieval World: AD 500-AD 1500, Amber Books, ISBN 1-86227-299-9
- (2005) The Artillery of the Dukes of Burgundy 1363-1477 (co-written Robert Douglas Smith) Boydell Press. ISBN 1843831627 OCLC 60322326
- (2007) Medieval Weapons: An Illustrated History of their Impact (co-written Robert Douglas Smith). ABC-CLIO. ISBN 9781851095315 OCLC 163587639
- (2011) Rhodes Besieged, 1480-1522: a New History (co-written Robert Douglas Smith) History Press.
- (2012) Medieval Military Technology 2nd ed. (co-written Robert Douglas Smith) University of Toronto Press.
- (2015) The Battle of Crecy: a Casebook (co-written Michael Livingston) University of Liverpool Press. (UK) ISBN 9781781382646 OCLC 932592007
