= Battle of Crécy =

1346 English victory during the Hundred Years' War

- Part of the Crécy campaign of the Edwardian phase of the Hundred Years' War
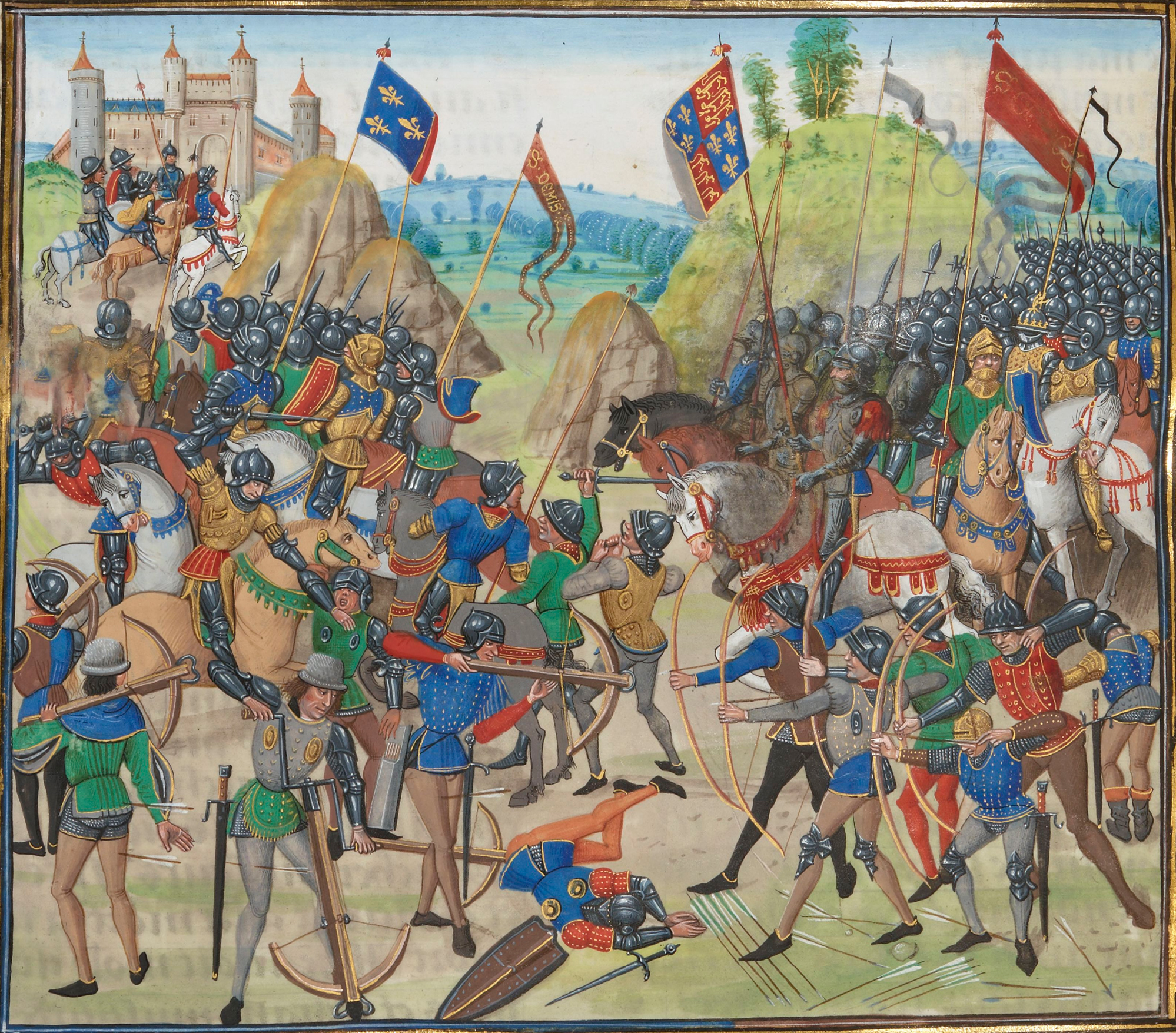
- The Battle of Crécy, from a 15th-century illuminated manuscript of Jean Froissart's Chronicles
Date	26 August 1346
Location	Crécy-en-Ponthieu, Picardy, France 50°15′23″N 01°53′16″E
Result	English victory

Belligerents
Kingdom of England	Kingdom of France; Kingdom of Bohemia; Duchy of Lorraine

Commanders and leaders
King Edward III; Edward the Black Prince; Earl of Northampton; Earl of Warwick; Earl of Arundel	King Philip VI (WIA); Charles II, Count of Alençon †; Rudolph, Duke of Lorraine †; Louis II, Count of Blois †; King John of Bohemia †; Prince Charles of Bohemia (WIA); Antonio Doria †

Strength
7,000–15,000	20,000–30,000 • 8,000 men-at-arms • 2,000–6,000 crossbowmen • Unknown infantry

Casualties and losses
100–300 killed	1,542–4,000 men-at-arms killed Infantry losses unknown but heavy
- Location of the battle within France

The Battle of Crécy took place on 26 August 1346 in northern France between a French army commanded by King Philip VI and an English army led by King Edward III. The French attacked the English while they were traversing northern France during the Hundred Years' War, resulting in an English victory and heavy loss of life among the French.

The English army had landed in the Cotentin Peninsula on 12 July. It had burnt a path of destruction through some of the richest lands in France to within 2 miles (3 km) of Paris, sacking many towns on the way. The English then marched north, hoping to link up with an allied Flemish army which had invaded from Flanders. Hearing that the Flemish had turned back, and having temporarily outdistanced the pursuing French, Edward had his army prepare a defensive position on a hillside near Crécy-en-Ponthieu. Late on 26 August the French army, which greatly outnumbered the English, attacked.

During a brief archery duel a large force of French mercenary crossbowmen was routed by Welsh and English longbowmen. The French then launched a series of cavalry charges by their mounted knights. These were disordered by their impromptu nature, by having to force their way through the fleeing crossbowmen, by the muddy ground, by having to charge uphill, and by the pits dug by the English. The attacks were further broken up by effective shooting by the English archers, which caused heavy casualties. By the time the French charges reached the English men-at-arms, who had dismounted for the battle, they had lost much of their impetus. The ensuing hand-to-hand combat was described as "murderous, without pity, cruel, and very horrible." The French charges continued late into the night, all with the same result: fierce fighting followed by a French retreat.

The English then laid siege to the port of Calais. The battle crippled the French army's ability to relieve the siege; the town fell to the English the following year and remained under English rule for more than two centuries, until 1558. Crécy established the effectiveness of the longbow as a dominant weapon on the Western European battlefield.

== Background ==
Since the Norman Conquest of 1066, English monarchs had held titles and lands within France, the possession of which made them vassals of the kings of France. Following a series of disagreements between Philip VI of France (r. 1328–1350) and Edward III of England (r. 1327–1377), on 24 May 1337 Philip's Great Council in Paris agreed that the lands held by Edward in France should be taken back into Philip's hands on the grounds that Edward was in breach of his obligations as a vassal. This marked the start of the Hundred Years' War, which was to last 116 years.

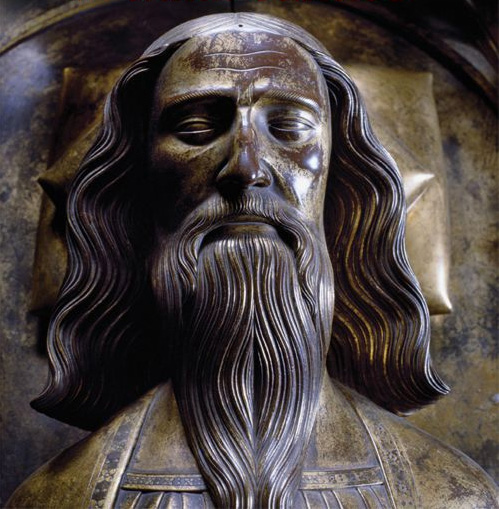
Edward III of England

There followed eight years of intermittent but expensive and inconclusive warfare: Edward campaigned three times in northern France to no effect; Gascony was left almost entirely to its own devices and the French made significant inroads in attritional warfare. In early 1345 Edward attempted another campaign in the north; his main army sailed on 29 June and anchored off Sluys in Flanders until 22 July, while Edward attended to diplomatic affairs. When it sailed, probably intending to land in Normandy, it was scattered by a storm. There were further delays and it proved impossible to take any action with this force before winter. Meanwhile, Henry, Earl of Derby, led a whirlwind campaign through Gascony at the head of an Anglo-Gascon army. He heavily defeated two large French armies at the battles of Bergerac and Auberoche, captured more than 100 French towns and fortifications in Périgord and Agenais and gave the English possessions in Gascony strategic depth.

In March 1346 a French army numbering between 15,000 and 20,000, "enormously superior" to any force the Anglo-Gascons could field, including all the military officers of the royal household, and commanded by John, Duke of Normandy, the son and heir of Philip VI, marched on Gascony. They besieged the strategically and logistically important town of Aiguillon. On 2 April the arrière-ban, the formal call to arms for all able-bodied males, was announced for the south of France. French financial, logistical and manpower efforts were focused on this offensive. Derby, now Lancaster, (Note: During the 1345 campaign he was known as the Earl of Derby, but his father died in September 1345 and he became the Earl of Lancaster. Sumption 1990, p. 476) sent an urgent appeal for help to Edward. Edward was not only morally obliged to succour his vassal but contractually required to; his indenture with Lancaster stated that if Lancaster were attacked by overwhelming numbers, then Edward "shall rescue him in one way or another".

Meanwhile, Edward was raising a fresh army, and assembled more than 700 vessels to transport it – the largest English fleet ever to that date. The French were aware of Edward's efforts, and to guard against the possibility of an English landing in northern France, relied on their powerful navy. This reliance was misplaced, and the French were unable to prevent Edward successfully crossing the Channel.

== Prelude ==
Map of the route of Edward III's chevauchée of 1346

The English landed at Saint-Vaast-la-Hougue, Normandy, on 12 July 1346. They achieved complete strategic surprise and marched south. Edward's soldiers razed every town in their path and looted whatever they could from the populace. Caen, the cultural, political, religious and financial centre of north-west Normandy, was stormed on 26 July and subsequently looted for five days. More than 5,000 French soldiers and civilians were killed; among the few prisoners was Raoul, Count of Eu, the Constable of France. On 29 July Edward sent his fleet back to England, laden with loot, with a letter ordering that reinforcements, supplies and money be collected, embarked and loaded respectively, and sent to rendezvous with his army at Crotoy, on the north bank of the mouth of the River Somme. The English marched out towards the River Seine on 1 August.

The French military position was difficult. Their main army, commanded by John, Duke of Normandy, the son and heir of Philip VI, was committed to the intractable siege of Aiguillon in the south west. After his surprise landing in Normandy, Edward was devastating some of the richest land in France and flaunting his ability to march at will through France. On 2 August, a small English force supported by many Flemings invaded France from Flanders; French defences there were completely inadequate. The treasury was all but empty. On 29 July, Philip proclaimed the arrière-ban for northern France, ordering every able-bodied male to assemble at Rouen, where Philip himself arrived on the 31st. On 7 August, the English reached the Seine, 12 miles (19 km) south of Rouen, and turned south-east. By 12 August, Edward's army was encamped at Poissy, 20 miles (30 km) from Paris, having left a 20-mile-wide swathe of destruction down the left bank of the Seine, burning villages to within 2 miles (3 km) of Paris. Philip's army marched parallel to the English on the other bank, and in turn encamped north of Paris, where it was steadily reinforced. Paris was in uproar, swollen with refugees, and preparations were made to defend the capital street by street.

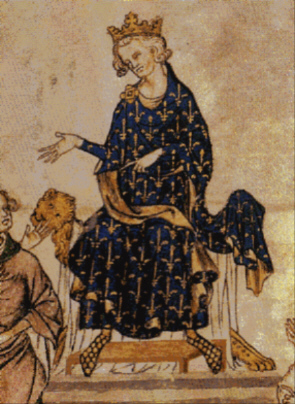
Philip VI of France

Philip sent orders to Duke John of Normandy insisting that he abandon the siege of Aiguillon and march his army north, which after delay and vacillation he did on 20 August – though he would ultimately not arrive in time to change the course of events in the north. The French army outside Paris consisted of some 8,000 men-at-arms, 6,000 crossbowmen, and many infantry levies. Philip sent a challenge on 14 August suggesting that the two armies do battle at a mutually agreed time and place in the area. Edward indicated that he would meet Philip to the south of the Seine, without actually committing himself. On 16 August the French moved into position; Edward promptly burnt down Poissy, destroyed the bridge there, and marched north.

The French had carried out a scorched earth policy, carrying away all stores of food and so forcing the English to spread out over a wide area to forage, which greatly slowed them. Bands of French peasants attacked some of the smaller groups of foragers. Philip reached the River Somme a day's march ahead of Edward. He based himself at Amiens and sent large detachments to hold every bridge and ford across the Somme between Amiens and the sea. The English were now trapped in an area which had been stripped of food. The French moved out of Amiens and advanced westwards, towards the English. They were now willing to give battle, knowing they would have the advantage of standing on the defensive while the English were forced to try to fight their way past them.

Edward was determined to break the French blockade of the Somme and probed at several points, vainly attacking Hangest and Pont-Remy before moving west along the river. English supplies were running out and the army was ragged, starving and beginning to suffer from a drop in morale. On the evening of 24 August the English were encamped north of Acheux while the French were 6 miles (10 km) away at Abbeville. During the night the English marched on a tidal ford named Blanchetaque. The far bank was defended by a force of 3,500 French. English longbowmen and mounted men-at-arms waded into the tidal river and after a short, sharp fight routed the French. The main French army had followed the English, and their scouts captured some stragglers and several wagons, but Edward had broken free of immediate pursuit. Such was the French confidence that Edward would not ford the Somme that the area beyond had not been denuded, allowing Edward's army to plunder it and resupply.

Meanwhile, the Flemings, having been rebuffed by the French at Estaires, besieged Béthune on 14 August. After several setbacks they fell out among themselves, burnt their siege equipment and gave up their expedition on 24 August. Edward received the news that he would not be reinforced by the Flemings shortly after crossing the Somme. The ships which were expected to be waiting off Crotoy were nowhere to be seen. Edward decided to engage Philip's army with the force he had. Having temporarily shaken off the French pursuit, he used the respite to prepare a defensive position at Crécy-en-Ponthieu. The French returned to Abbeville, crossed the Somme at the bridge there, and doggedly set off after the English again.

== Opposing forces ==
=== English army ===
The English army comprised almost exclusively English and Welsh soldiers, along with a handful of Normans disaffected with Philip VI and a few German mercenaries, the foreigners constituting probably no more than 150 in number. The exact size and composition of the English force is not known. Contemporary estimates vary widely; for example Froissart's third version of his Chronicles more than doubles his estimate in the first. Modern historians have estimated its size as from 7,000 to 15,000. Andrew Ayton suggests a figure of around 14,000: 2,500 men-at-arms, 5,000 longbowmen, 3,000 hobelars (light cavalry and mounted archers) and 3,500 spearmen. Clifford Rogers suggests 15,000: 2,500 men-at-arms, 7,000 longbowmen, 3,250 hobelars and 2,300 spearmen. Jonathan Sumption, going by the carrying capacity of its original transport fleet, believes the force was around 7,000 to 10,000. Up to a thousand men were convicted felons serving on the promise of a pardon at the end of the campaign. Many of the English, including many of the felons, were veterans; perhaps as many as half.

The men-at-arms of both armies wore a quilted gambeson under mail armour which covered the body and limbs. This was supplemented by varying amounts of plate armour on the body and limbs, more so for wealthier and more experienced men. Heads were protected by bascinets: open-faced iron or steel helmets, with mail attached to the lower edge of the helmet to protect the throat, neck and shoulders. A moveable visor (face guard) protected the face. Heater shields, typically made from thin wood overlaid with leather, were carried. The English men-at-arms were all dismounted. The weapons they used are not recorded, but in similar battles they used their lances as pikes, cut them down to use as short spears, or fought with swords and battle axes.

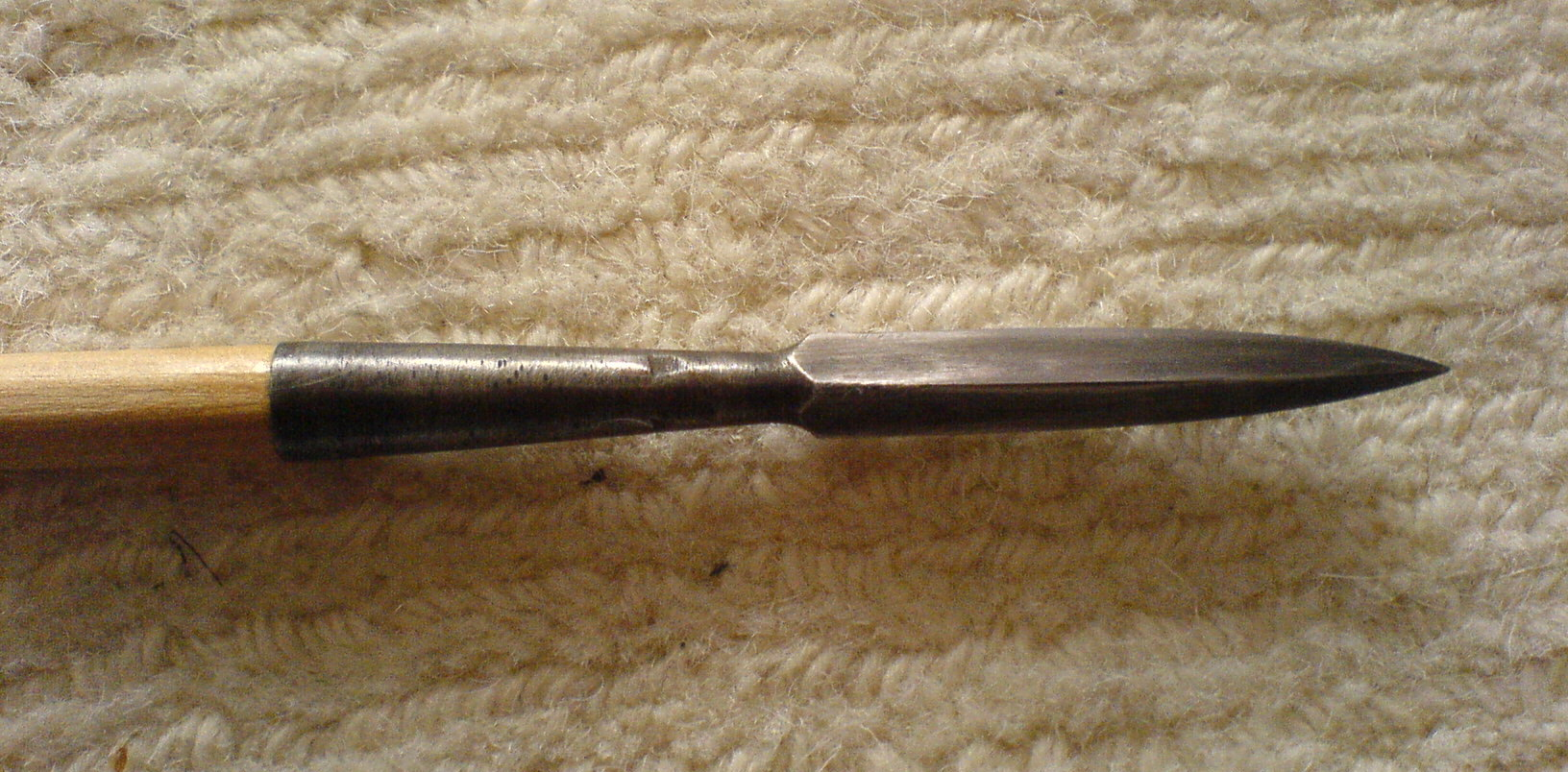
A modern replica of a bodkin point arrowhead used by English longbows to penetrate armour

The longbow used by the English and Welsh archers was unique to them; it took up to ten years to master and could discharge up to ten arrows per minute well over 300 metres (980 ft). (Note: This range is given by material scientists and is supported by most modern historians. Some historians argue that the range of a longbow would not have exceeded 200 metres (660 ft). Mitchell 2008, p. 242) A computer analysis in 2017 by Warsaw University of Technology demonstrated that heavy bodkin point arrows could penetrate typical plate armour of the time at 225 metres (738 ft). The depth of penetration would be slight at that range; predicted penetration increased as the range closed or against armour of less than the best quality available at the time. (Note: When computer modelling from 2006 was matched against the performance of replica bows, these were found to be "in good agreement with experimental measurements".Pratt 2010, p. 216) Contemporary sources speak of arrows frequently piercing armour. Archers carried one quiver of 24 arrows as standard. During the morning of the battle, they were each issued two more quivers, for a total of 72 arrows per man. This was sufficient for perhaps fifteen minutes' shooting at the maximum rate, although as the battle wore on the rate would slow. Regular resupply of ammunition would be required from the wagons to the rear; the archers would also venture forward during pauses in the fighting to retrieve arrows. Modern historians suggest that half a million arrows could have been shot during the battle.

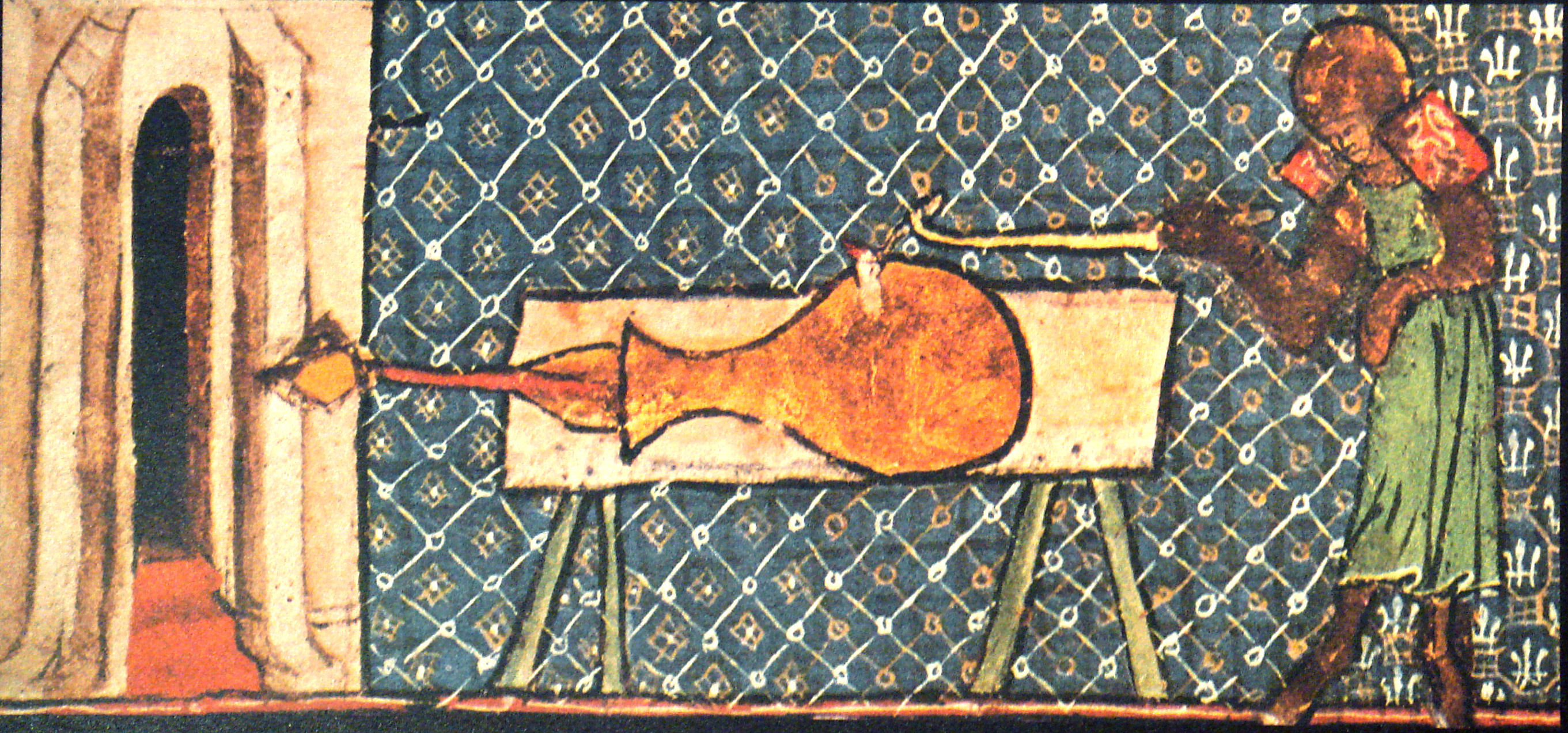
A soldier firing a trestle-mounted vase gun. From Walter de Milemete's De Nobilitatibus, 1326–7.

The English army was also equipped with several types of gunpowder weapons, in unknown numbers: small guns firing lead balls; ribauldequins firing either metal arrows or grapeshot; and bombards, an early form of cannon firing metal balls 80–90 millimetres (3 1/4–3 5/8 in) in diameter. Contemporary accounts and modern historians differ as to what types of these weapons and how many were present at Crécy, but several iron balls compatible with the bombard ammunition have since been retrieved from the site of the battle.

=== French army ===
The exact size of the French army is even less certain, as the financial records from the Crécy campaign are lost, although there is consensus that it was substantially larger than the English. Contemporary chroniclers all note it as being extremely large for the period. The two who provide totals estimate its size as 72,000 or 120,000. The numbers of mounted men-at-arms are given as either 12,000 or 20,000. An Italian chronicler claimed 100,000 knights (men-at-arms), 12,000 infantry and 5,000 crossbowmen. Contemporary chroniclers estimated the crossbowmen present as between 2,000 and 20,000.

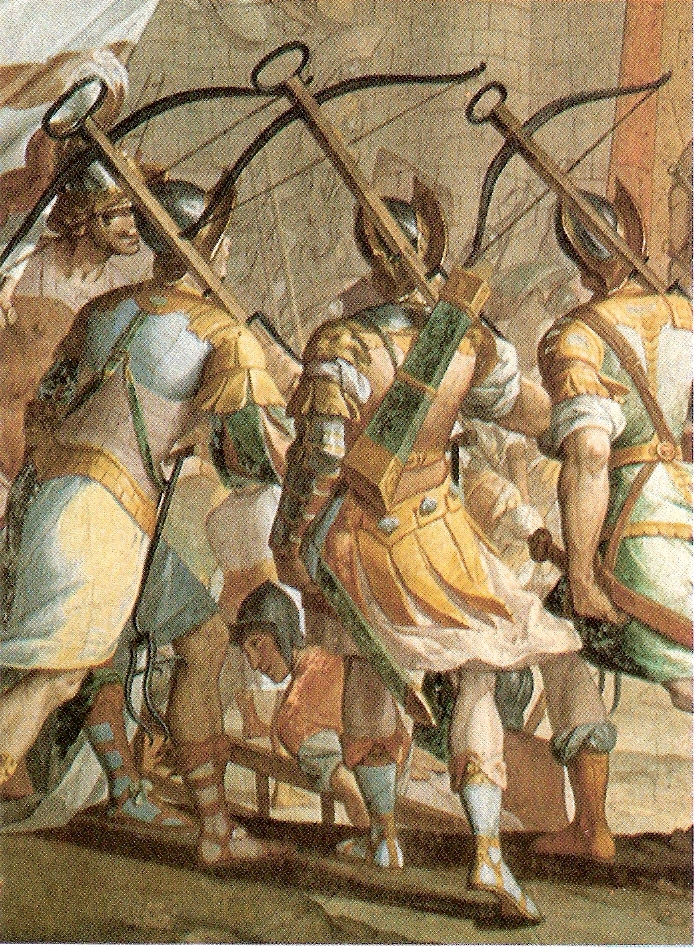
Italian crossbowmen

These numbers are described by historians as exaggerated and unrealistic, on the basis of the extant war treasury records for 1340, six years before the battle. Clifford Rogers estimates "the French host was at least twice as large as the [English], and perhaps as much as three times." According to modern estimates, 8,000 mounted men-at-arms formed the core of the French army, supported by two to six thousand mercenary crossbowmen recruited by and hired from the major trading city of Genoa, (Note: The number of the Genoese crossbowmen is variously given as two, four, and six thousand. Schnerb questions the higher figure, based on estimates that 2,000 crossbowmen were available in all of France in 1340, and doubts that Genoa alone could have recruited several thousand crossbowmen.) and a "large, though indeterminate, number of common infantry". How many common infantrymen, militia and levies of variable levels of equipment and training, were present is not known with any certainty, except that on their own they outnumbered the English army.

The French men-at-arms were equipped similarly to the English. They were mounted on entirely unarmoured horses and carried wooden lances, usually ash, tipped with iron and approximately 4 metres (13 ft) long. Many of the men-at-arms in the French army were foreigners: many joined individually out of a spirit of adventure and the attractive rates of pay offered. Others were in contingents contributed by Philip's allies: three kings, a prince-bishop, a duke and three counts led entourages from non-French territories.

Since Philip came to the throne, French armies had included an increasing proportion of crossbowmen. As there were few archers in France, they were usually recruited from abroad, typically Genoa; their foreign origin led to them frequently being labelled mercenaries. They were professional soldiers and in battle were protected from missiles by pavises – very large shields with their own bearers, behind each of which three crossbowmen could shelter. A trained crossbowman could shoot his weapon approximately twice a minute to a shorter effective range than a longbowman of about 200 metres (220 yd).

=== Initial deployments ===
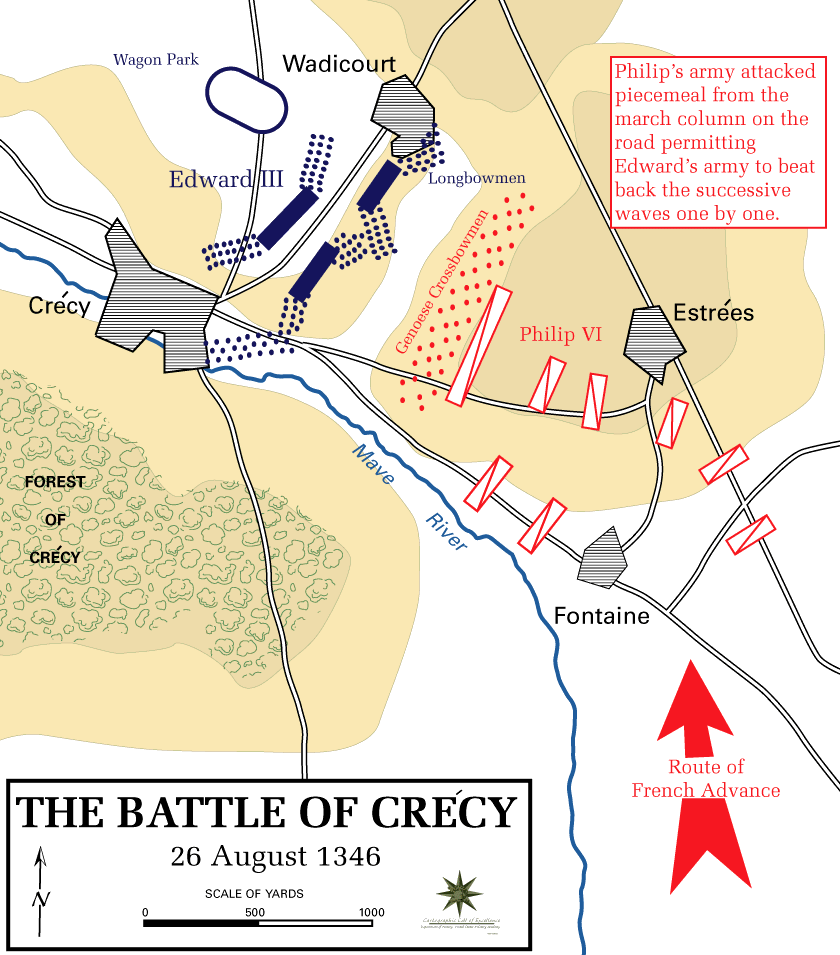
Map of the Battle of Crécy: Blue dots – English archers Blue blocks – other English infantry / Red dots – French crossbowmen Red rectangles – French men-at-arms

Edward deployed his army in a carefully selected position, facing south east on a sloping hillside, broken by copses and terracing, at Crécy-en-Ponthieu. This was in an area which Edward had inherited from his mother and well known to several of the English; it has been suggested that the position had long been considered a suitable site for a battle. The left flank was anchored against Wadicourt, while the right was protected by Crécy itself and the River Maye beyond. This made it difficult for the French to outflank them. The position had a ready line of retreat in the event that the English were defeated or put under intolerable pressure. While waiting for the French to catch up with them, the English dug pits in front of their positions, intended to disorder attacking cavalry, and set up several primitive gunpowder weapons. Edward wished to provoke the French into a mounted charge uphill against his solid infantry formations of dismounted men-at-arms, backed by Welsh spearmen and flanked by archers. The army had been in position since dawn, and so was rested and well-fed, giving them an advantage over the French, who did not rest before the battle. Having decisively defeated a large French detachment two days before, the English troops' morale was high.

The English army was divided into three battalions, or "battles", deployed in a column. The King's son, Edward, Prince of Wales, aided by the earls of Northampton and Warwick (the 'constable' and 'marshal' of the army, respectively), commanded the vanguard with 800 men-at-arms, 2,000 archers and 1,000 foot soldiers including Welsh spearmen. To its left, the other battle was led by the Earl of Arundel, with 800 men-at-arms and 1,200 archers. Behind them, the King commanded the reserve battle, with 700 men-at-arms and 2,000 archers. Each division was composed of men-at-arms in the centre, all on foot, with ranks of spearmen immediately behind them, and with longbowmen on each flank and in a skirmish line to their front. Many of the longbowmen were concealed in small woods, or by lying down in ripe wheat. The baggage train was positioned to the rear of the whole army, where it was circled and fortified, to serve as a park for the horses, a defence against any possible attack from the rear and a rallying point in the event of defeat.

Around noon on 26 August French scouts, advancing north from Abbeville, came in sight of the English. The crossbowmen, under Antonio Doria and Carlo Grimaldi, formed the French vanguard. Following was a large battle of mounted men-at-arms led by Count Charles of Alençon, Philip's brother, accompanied by the blind King John of Bohemia. The next battle was led by Duke Rudolph of Lorraine and Count Louis of Blois, while Philip commanded the rearguard. As news filtered back that the English had turned to fight, the French contingents sped up, jostling with each other to reach the front of the column. The Italians stayed in the van, while the mounted men-at-arms left their accompanying infantry and wagons behind. Discipline was lost; the French were hampered by the absence of their Constable, who was normally responsible for marshalling and leading their army, but who had been captured at Caen. Once it halted, men, especially infantry, were continually joining Philip's battle as they marched north west from Abbeville.

After reconnoitring the English position, a council of war was held where the senior French officials, who were completely confident of victory, advised an attack, but not until the next day. The army was tired from a 12-mile march, and needed to reorganise so as to be able to attack in strength. It was also known that the Count of Savoy, with more than 500 men-at-arms, was marching to join the French and was nearby. (He intercepted some of the French survivors the day after the battle). Despite this advice, the French attacked later the same afternoon; it is unclear from the contemporary sources whether this was a deliberate choice by Philip, or because too many of the French knights kept pressing forward and the battle commenced against his wishes. Philip's plan was to use the long-range missiles of his crossbowmen to soften up the English infantry and disorder, and possibly dishearten, their formations, so as to allow the accompanying mounted men-at-arms to break into their ranks and rout them. Modern historians have generally considered this to have been a practical approach, and one with proven success against other armies.

== Battle ==
=== Archery duel ===
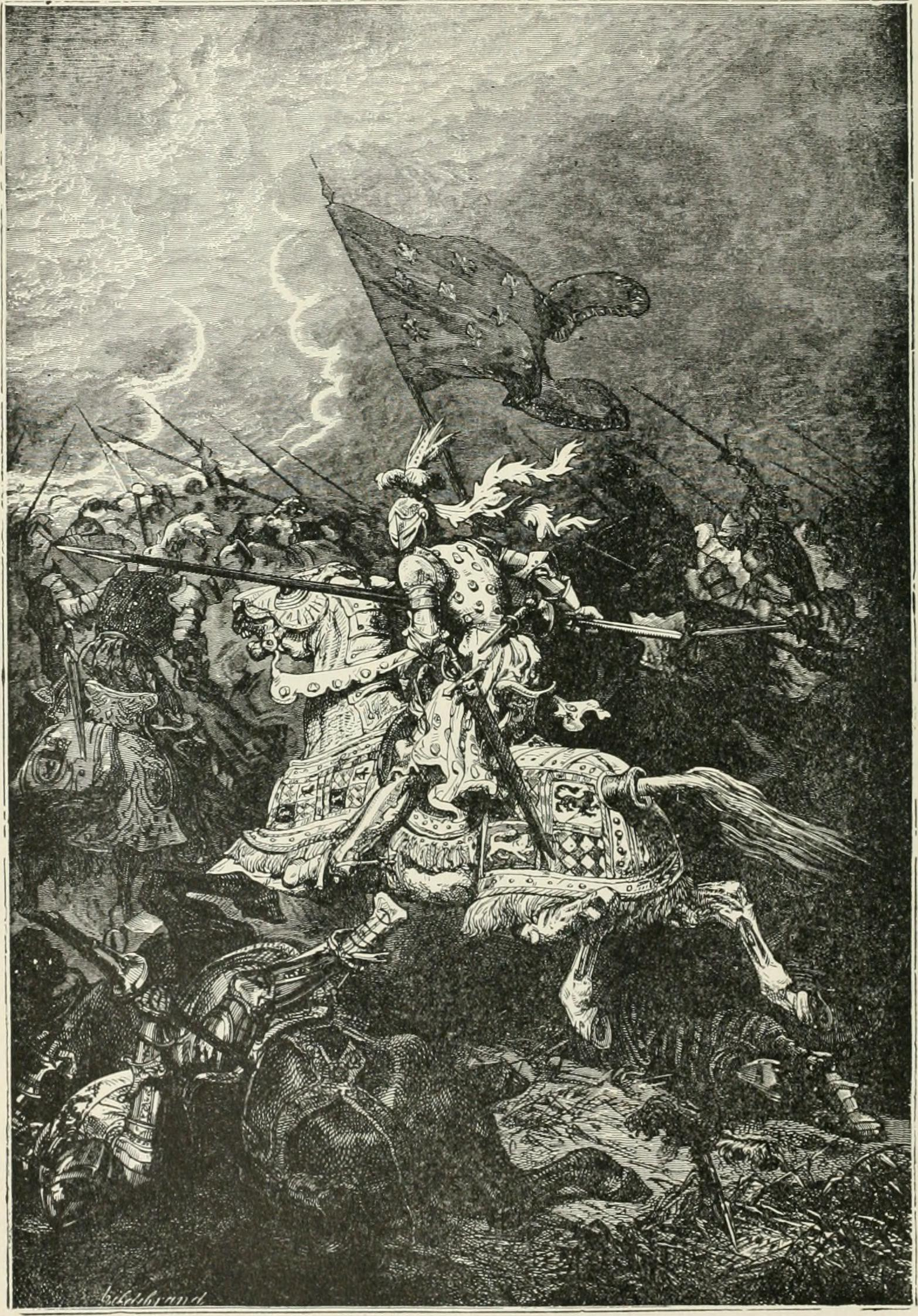
Battle of Crécy (19th-century engraving)

The French army moved forward late in the afternoon, unfurling their sacred battle banner, the oriflamme, indicating that no prisoners would be taken. As they advanced, a sudden rainstorm broke over the field. The English archers de-strung their bows to avoid the strings becoming slackened. A contemporary account, followed by some modern historians, has the rain weakening the Genoese crossbows' strings, reducing their power and range; other modern historians state that their bowstrings were protected by leather coverings and so the Genoese were as unaffected by the storm as the English archers.

The Genoese engaged the English longbowmen in an archery duel. The longbowmen outranged their opponents and had a rate of fire more than three times greater. The crossbowmen were also without their protective pavises, which were still with the French baggage, as were their reserve supplies of ammunition. The mud also impeded their ability to reload, which required them to press the stirrups of their weapons into the ground, and thus slowed their rate of fire.

The Italians were rapidly defeated and fled; aware of their vulnerability without their pavises, they may have made only a token effort. Modern historians disagree as to how many casualties they suffered; some contemporary sources suggest they may have failed to get off any shots at all, while a recent specialist study of this duel concludes that they hastily shot perhaps two volleys, then withdrew before any real exchange with the English could develop. Italian casualties in this phase of the battle were probably light.

The knights and nobles following in Alençon's division, hampered by the routed mercenaries, hacked at them as they retreated. By most contemporary accounts the crossbowmen were considered cowards at best and more likely traitors, and many of them were killed by the French. The clash of the retreating Genoese and the advancing French cavalry threw the leading battle into disarray. The longbowmen continued to shoot into the massed troops. The discharge of the English bombards added to the confusion, though contemporary accounts differ as to whether they inflicted significant casualties.

=== Cavalry charges ===
Alençon's battle (division of the army) then launched a cavalry charge. This was disordered by its impromptu nature, by having to force its way through the fleeing Italians, by the muddy ground, by having to charge uphill, and by the pits dug by the English. The attack was further broken up by the heavy and effective shooting from the English archers, which caused many casualties. It is likely the archers preserved their ammunition until they had a reasonable chance of penetrating the French armour, which would be at a range of about 80 metres (260 ft). The armoured French riders had some protection, but their horses were completely unarmoured and were killed or wounded in large numbers. Disabled horses fell, spilling or trapping their riders and causing following ranks to swerve to avoid them and fall into even further disorder. Wounded horses fled across the hillside in panic. By the time the tight formation of English men-at-arms and spearmen received the French charge it had lost much of its impetus.

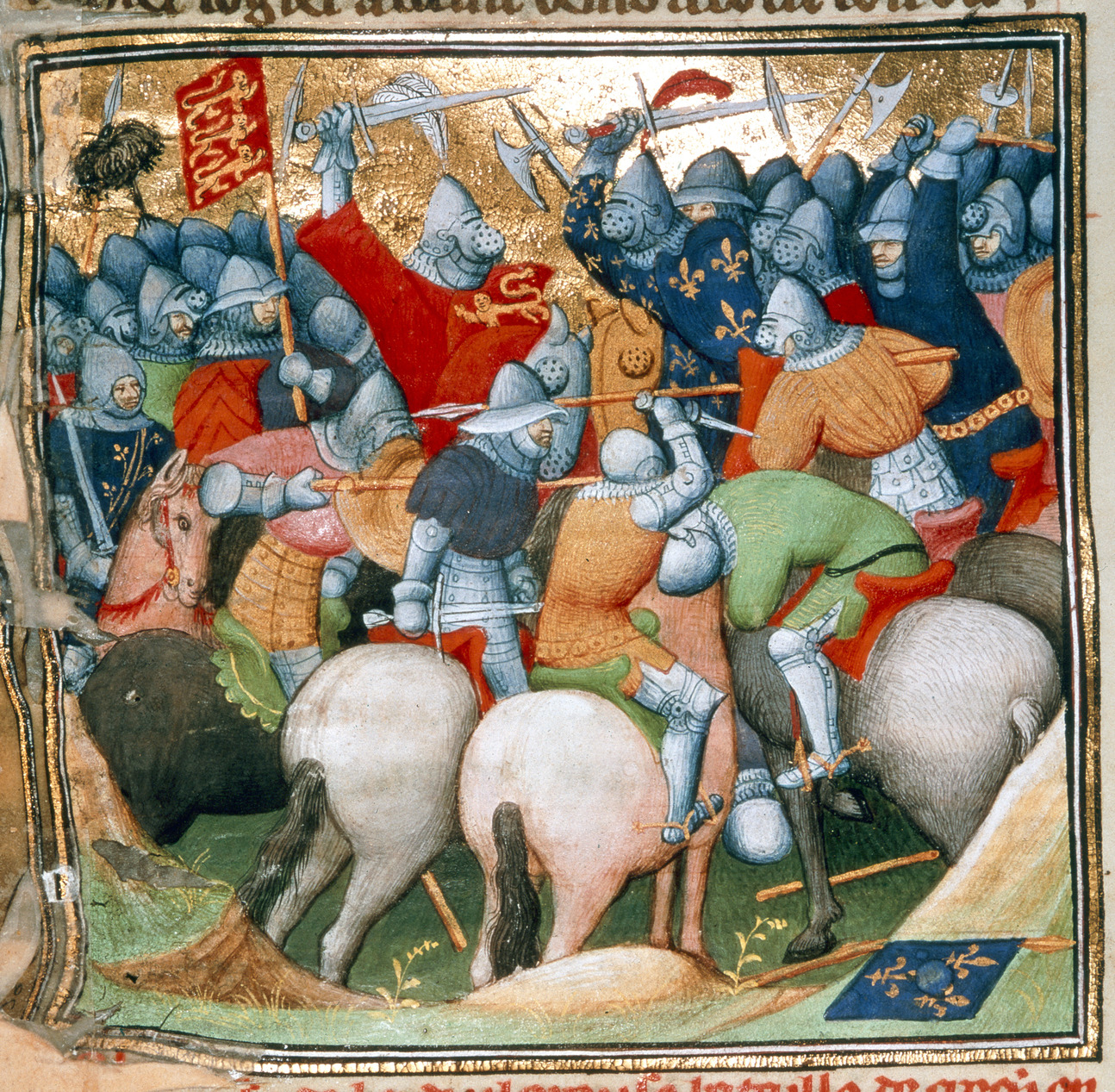
Battle of Crécy, as envisaged 80 years after the battle

A contemporary described the hand-to-hand combat which ensued as "murderous, without pity, cruel, and very horrible." Men-at-arms who lost their footing, or who were thrown from wounded horses, were trampled underfoot, crushed by falling horses and bodies and suffocated in the mud. After the battle, many French bodies were recovered with no marks on them. Alençon was among those killed. The French attack was beaten off. English infantry moved forward to knife the French wounded, loot the bodies and recover arrows. Some sources say Edward had given orders that, contrary to custom, no prisoners be taken; outnumbered as he was he did not want to lose fighting men to escorting and guarding captives. In any event, there is no record of any prisoners being taken until the next day, after the battle.

Fresh forces of French cavalry moved into position at the foot of the hill and repeated Alençon's charge. They had the same problems as Alençon's force, with the added disadvantage that the ground they were advancing over was littered with dead and wounded horses and men. Ayton and Preston write of "long mounds of fallen warhorses and men ... add[ing] significantly to the difficulties facing fresh formations ... as they sought to approach the English position." Nevertheless, they charged home, albeit in such a disordered state that they were again unable to break into the English formation. A prolonged mêlée resulted, with a report that at one point the Prince of Wales was beaten to his knees. One account has the Prince's standard-bearer standing on his banner to prevent its capture. A modern historian has described the fighting as "horrific carnage". Edward sent forward a detachment from his reserve battle to rescue the situation. The French were again repulsed. They came again. The English ranks were thinned, but those in the rear stepped forward to fill the gaps.

How many times the French charged is disputed, but they continued late into the night, with the dusk and then dark disorganising the French yet further. All had the same result: fierce fighting followed by a French retreat. In one attack the Count of Blois dismounted his men and had them advance on foot; the Count's body was found on the field. The French nobility stubbornly refused to yield. There was no lack of courage on either side. Famously, blind King John of Bohemia tied his horse's bridle to those of his attendants and galloped into the twilight; all were dragged from their horses and killed. There are accounts of entire English battles advancing on occasion to clear away broken French charges milling in front of them, then withdrawing in good order to their original positions.

Philip himself was caught up in the fighting, had two horses killed under him, and received an arrow in the jaw. The bearer of the oriflamme was a particular target for the English archers; he was seen to fall but survived, albeit abandoning the sacred banner to be captured. Finally, Philip abandoned the field of battle, although it is unclear why. It was nearly midnight and the battle petered out, with the majority of the French army melting away from the battlefield. The English slept where they had fought. The next morning substantial French forces were still arriving on the battlefield, to be charged by the English men-at-arms, now mounted, routed and pursued for miles. Their losses alone were reported as several thousand, including the Duke of Lorraine. Meanwhile, a few wounded or stunned Frenchmen were pulled from the heaps of dead men and dying horses and taken prisoner.

== Casualties ==
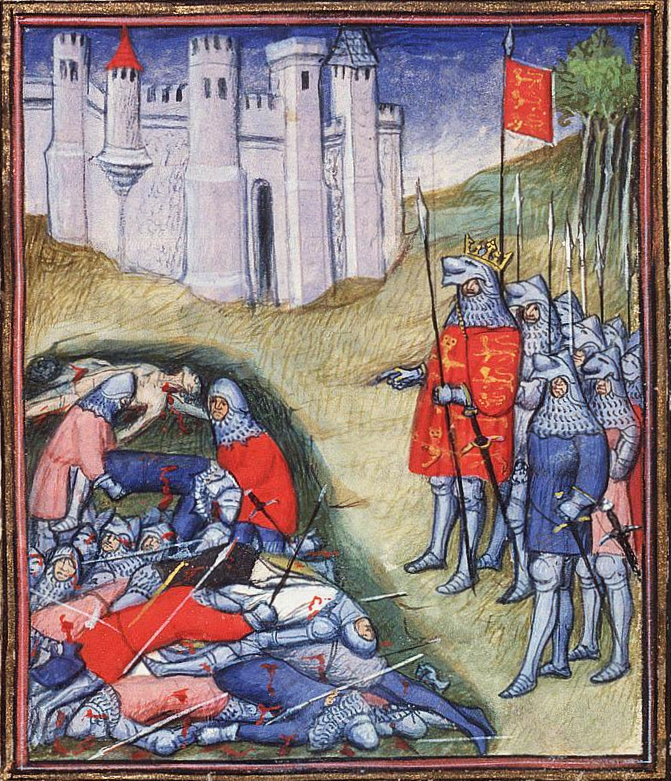
Edward III counting the dead on the battlefield of Crécy

The losses in the battle were highly asymmetrical. All contemporary sources agree that English casualties were very low. It was reported that English deaths comprised three or four men-at-arms and a small number of the rank and file, for a total of forty according to a roll-call after the battle. It has been suggested by some modern historians that this is too few and that English deaths might have numbered around three hundred. To date, only two Englishmen killed at the battle have been identified; two English knights were also taken prisoner, although it is unclear at what stage in the battle this happened.

The French casualties are considered to have been very high. According to a count made by the English heralds after the battle, the bodies of 1,542 French noble men-at-arms were found (perhaps not including the hundreds who died in the clash of the following day). More than 2,200 heraldic coats were reportedly taken from the field of battle as war booty by the English. No such count was made of the lower-born foot soldiers, as their equipment was not worth looting. No reliable figures exist for losses among them, although their casualties were also considered to have been heavy, and a large number were said to have been wounded with arrows. The dead on the second day of battle alone were said to have been exceptionally numerous, with estimates varying from 2,000 to, according to Edward III himself, 4,000.

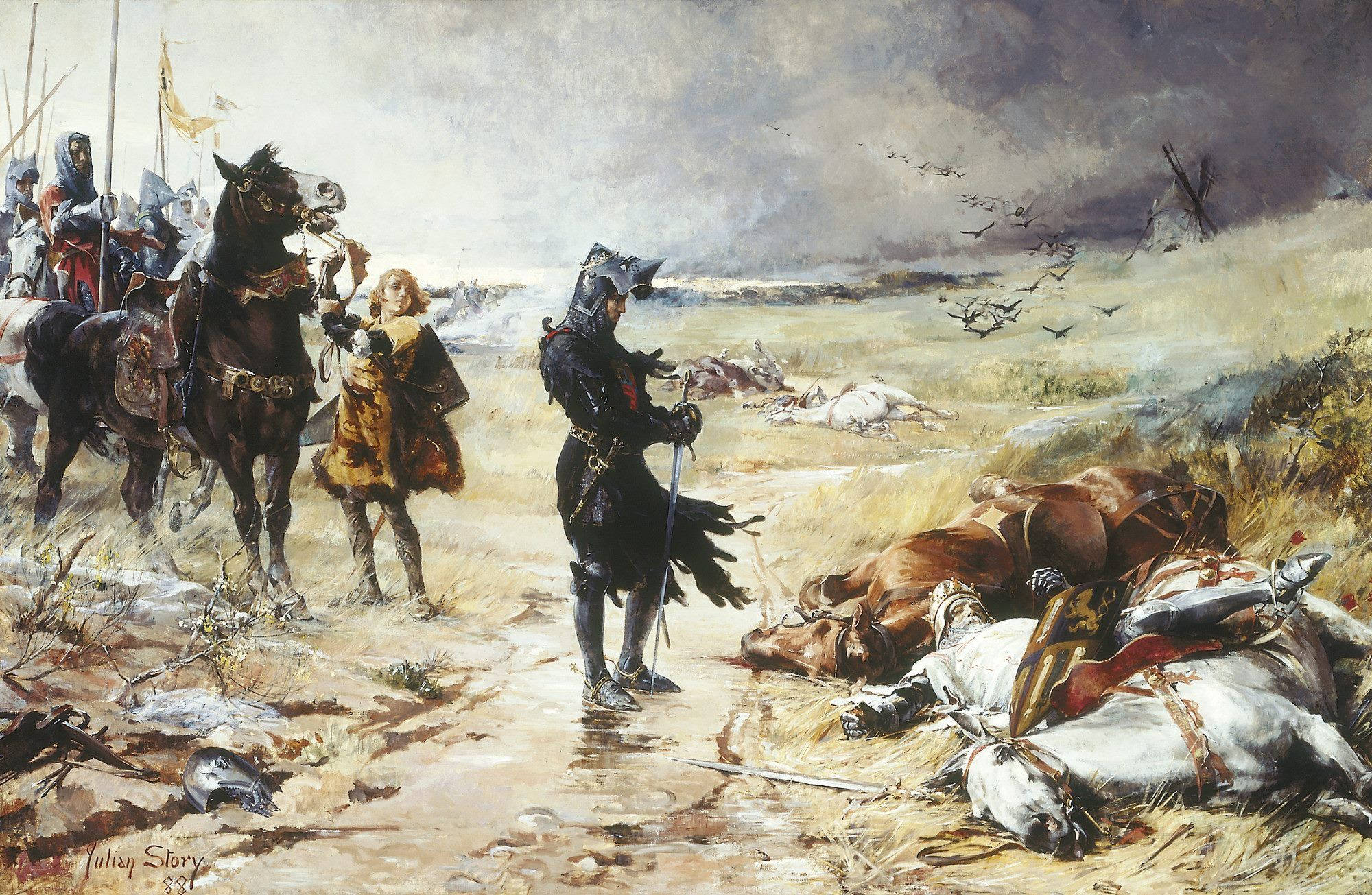
1888 painting of the Black Prince viewing King John's corpse after the battle

A disproportionate number of magnates featured among the slain on the French side, including one king (John of Bohemia), nine princes, ten counts, a duke, an archbishop and a bishop. According to Ayton, these heavy losses can also be attributed to the chivalric ideals held by knights of the time, since nobles would have preferred to die in battle, rather than dishonourably flee the field, especially in view of their fellow knights.

No reliable figures exist for losses among the common French soldiery, although they were also considered to have been heavy. Jean Le Bel estimated 15,000–16,000. Froissart writes that the French army suffered a total of 30,000 killed or captured. The modern historian Alfred Burne estimates 10,000 infantry, as "a pure guess", for a total of 12,000 French dead.

== Aftermath ==
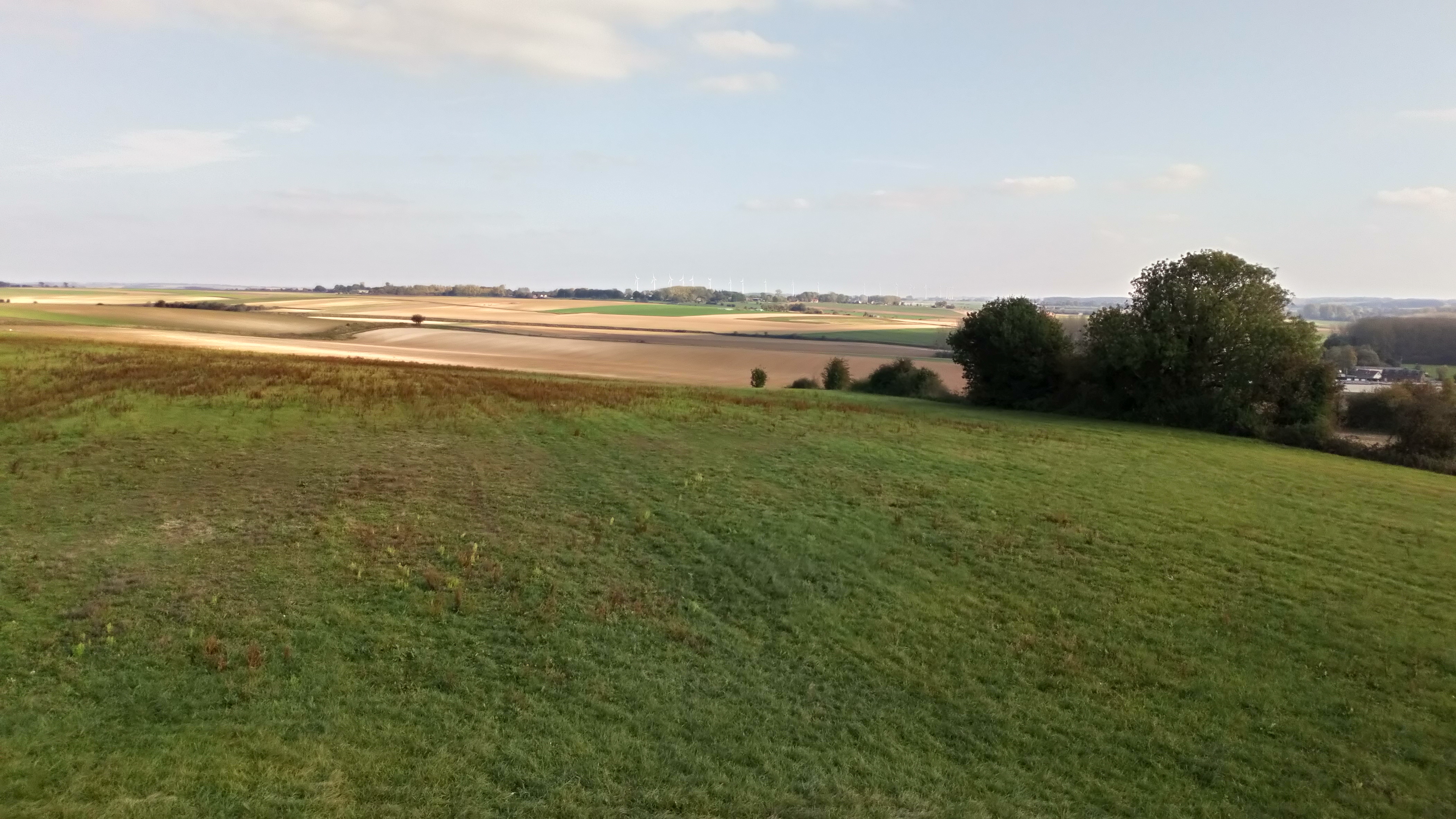
The battlefield in 2018

The result of the battle is described by Clifford Rogers as "a total victory for the English", and by Ayton as "unprecedented" and "a devastating military humiliation" for the French. Sumption considers it "a political catastrophe for the French Crown". The battle was reported to the English parliament on 13 September in glowing terms as a sign of divine favour and justification for the huge cost of the war to date. A contemporary chronicler opined "By haste and disorganisation were the French destroyed." Rogers writes that, among other factors, the English "benefitted from superior organisation, cohesion and leadership" and from "the indiscipline of the French". According to Ayton "England's international reputation as a military power was established in an evening's hard fighting."

Edward ended the campaign by laying siege to Calais, which fell after eleven months, the Battle of Crécy having crippled the French army's ability to relieve the town. This secured an English entrepôt into northern France which was held for two hundred years. The battle established the effectiveness of the longbow as a dominant weapon on the Western European battlefield. English and Welsh archers served as mercenaries in Italy in significant numbers, and some as far afield as Hungary. Modern historian Joseph Dahmus includes the Battle of Crécy in his Seven Decisive Battles of the Middle Ages.

== Notes, citations and sources ==
=== Sources ===
- Ayton, Andrew (2007a) [2005]. "The Battle of Crécy: Context and Significance" ( (PDF)). In Ayton, Andrew & Preston, Philip (eds.). The Battle of Crécy, 1346. Woodbridge, Suffolk: Boydell Press. pp. 1–34. ISBN 978-1-84383-115-0. Archived from the original on 5 February 2019.
- Ayton, Andrew (2007b) [2005]. "The Crécy Campaign". In Ayton, Andrew & Preston, Philip (eds.). The Battle of Crécy, 1346. Woodbridge, Suffolk: Boydell Press. pp. 35–108. ISBN 978-1-84383-115-0.
- Ayton, Andrew (2007c) [2005]. "The English Army at Crécy". In Ayton, Andrew & Preston, Philip (eds.). The Battle of Crécy, 1346. Woodbridge, Suffolk: Boydell Press. pp. 159–251. ISBN 978-1-84383-115-0.
- Ayton, Andrew & Preston, Sir Philip (2007) [2005]. "Topography and Archery: Further Reflections on the Battle of Crécy". In Ayton, Andrew & Preston, Philip (eds.). The Battle of Crécy, 1346. Woodbridge, Suffolk: Boydell Press. pp. 351–377. ISBN 978-1-84383-115-0.
- Bachrach, Bernard S.; Bachrach, David S. (2017). Warfare in Medieval Europe c.400–c.1453. Abington, Oxfordshire; New York: Routledge. ISBN 978-1-138-88765-7.
- Bennett, Matthew (1994). "The Development of Battle Tactics in the Hundred Years War". In Anne Curry & Michael Hughes (eds.). Arms, Armies and Fortifications in the Hundred Years War. Woodbridge, Suffolk: Boydell Press. pp. 1–20. ISBN 978-0-85115-365-0.
- Burne, Alfred (1999) [1955]. The Crécy War. Ware, Hertfordshire: Wordsworth Editions. ISBN 978-1-84022-210-4.
- Curry, Anne (2002). The Hundred Years' War 1337–1453 (PDF). Oxford: Osprey Publishing. ISBN 978-1-84176-269-2. Archived from the original (PDF) on 27 September 2018.
- Dahmus, Joseph (1983). "The Battle of Crecy". Seven Decisive Battles of the Middle Ages. Chicago: Nelson-Hall. pp. 168–196. ISBN 978-0-8304-1030-9.
- DeVries, Kelly (1998) [1996]. Infantry Warfare in the Early Fourteenth Century. Woodbridge, Suffolk: Boydell Press. ISBN 978-0-85115-567-8.
- DeVries, Kelly (2015). "The Implications of the Anonimo Romano Account of the Battle of Crécy". In Gregory I. Halfond (ed.). The Medieval Way of War: Studies in Medieval Military History in Honor of Bernard S. Bachrach. London: Routledge. pp. 309–322. ISBN 978-1-4724-1958-3.
- Edge, David; Paddock, John (1988). Arms & Armor of the Medieval Knight. New York: Crescent Books. ISBN 978-0-517-64468-3.
- Fowler, Kenneth (1961). Henry of Grosmont, First Duke of Lancaster, 1310–1361 (PDF) (PhD thesis). Leeds: University of Leeds. Archived (PDF) from the original on 11 October 2018.
- Froissart, Jean (1908). G.C. Macaulay (ed.). The Chronicles of Froissart. Translated by John Bourchier, Lord Berners. London: MacMillan. OCLC 2925301. (Also available as an ebook published in 2000 ISBN 978-0-585-04908-3)
- Gribit, Nicholas (2016). Henry of Lancaster's Expedition to Aquitaine 1345–46. Woodbridge, Suffolk: Boydell Press. ISBN 978-1-78327-117-7. Archived from the original on 3 August 2020.
- Harari, Yuval (1999). "Inter-frontal Cooperation in the Fourteenth Century and Edward III's 1346 Campaign" (PDF). War in History. 6 (4): 379–395. doi:10.1177/096834459900600401. S2CID 59055741. Archived from the original (PDF) on 22 June 2019.
- Hardy, Robert (2010) [1976]. Longbow: A Social and Military History (PDF) (reprint of 4th ed.). Yeovil, Somerset: Haynes Publishing. ISBN 978-1-85260-620-6. Archived (PDF) from the original on 6 December 2018.
- King, Andy (2002). "'According to the Custom used in French and Scottish wars': Prisoners and Casualties on the Scottish Marches in the Fourteenth Century" (PDF). Journal of Medieval History. 28 (3): 263–290. doi:10.1016/S0048-721X(02)00057-X. S2CID 159873083. Archived from the original (PDF) on 22 October 2019.
- King, Andy (2017). "'Then a Great Misfortune Befell Them': the Laws of War on Surrender and the Killing of Prisoners on the Battlefield in the Hundred Years War" (PDF). Journal of Medieval History. 43 (1): 106–117. doi:10.1080/03044181.2016.1236502. S2CID 159619516. Archived from the original (PDF) on 22 October 2019.
- Livingston, Michael (2022). Crécy: Battle of Five Kings. Oxford: Osprey. ISBN 978-1-4728-4706-5.
- Livingstone, Marilyn & Witzel, Morgen (2004). The Road to Crécy: The English Invasion of France, 1346. London: Routledge. ISBN 978-0-582-78420-8.
- Lucas, Henry S. (1929). The Low Countries and the Hundred Years' War: 1326–1347. Ann Arbor: University of Michigan Press. OCLC 960872598. Archived from the original on 3 August 2020.
- Lynn, John (2003). Battle: A History of Combat and Culture. Boulder, CO: Westview Press. ISBN 978-0-8133-3371-7.
- Magier, Mariusz; Nowak, Adrian; et al. (2017). "Numerical Analysis of English Bows used in Battle of Crécy". Problemy Techniki Uzbrojenia. 142 (2): 69–85. doi:10.5604/01.3001.0010.5152. ISSN 1230-3801.
- Mallett, Michael (1974). Mercenaries and their Masters: Warfare in Renaissance Italy. London: Bodley Head. ISBN 978-0-370-10502-4.
- Mitchell, Russell (2008). "The Longbow-Crossbow Shootout at Crécy (1346): Has the "Rate of Fire Commonplace" Been Overrated?". In L. J. Andrew Villalon & Donald J. Kagay (eds.). The Hundred Years War (Part II): Different Vistas. Leiden: Brill. pp. 233–257. ISBN 978-90-04-16821-3.
- Neillands, Robin (2001). The Hundred Years War. London: Routledge. ISBN 978-0-415-26131-9.
- Oman, Charles (1998) [1924]. A History of the Art of War in the Middle Ages: 1278–1485 A.D. London: Greenhill Books. ISBN 978-1-85367-332-0. Archived from the original on 3 August 2020.
- Ormrod, W. Mark (2012). Edward III. New Haven: Yale University Press. ISBN 978-0-300-11910-7. Archived from the original on 4 June 2020.
- Pratt, P.L. (2010). "Testing the Bows". In Hardy, Robert (ed.). Longbow: A Social and Military History. Yeovil, Somerset: Haynes Publishing. pp. 205–217. ISBN 978-1-85260-620-6.
- Prestwich, Michael (2007). Plantagenet England 1225–1360. Oxford: Oxford University Press. ISBN 978-0-19-922687-0.
- Prestwich, Michael (2007b) [2005]. "The Battle of Crécy". In Ayton, Andrew & Preston, Philip (eds.). The Battle of Crécy, 1346. Woodbridge, Suffolk: Boydell Press. pp. 139–157. ISBN 978-1-84383-115-0.
- Rodger, N.A.M. (2004). The Safeguard of the Sea. London: Penguin. ISBN 978-0-14-029724-9.
- Rogers, Clifford (1993). "Edward III and the Dialectics of Strategy, 1327–1360". Transactions of the Royal Historical Society. 6th series. 4: 83–102. doi:10.2307/3679216. JSTOR 3679216. OCLC 931311378. S2CID 163041276.
- Rogers, Clifford (1998). "The Efficacy of the English Longbow: A Reply to Kelly DeVries" (PDF). War in History. 5 (2): 233–242. doi:10.1177/096834459800500205. S2CID 161286935. Archived from the original (PDF) on 3 February 2019.
- Rogers, Clifford (2000). War Cruel and Sharp: English Strategy under Edward III, 1327–1360. Woodbridge, Suffolk: Boydell Press. ISBN 978-0-85115-804-4. Archived from the original on 15 March 2022.
- Rogers, Clifford (2004). Bachrach, Bernard S; DeVries, Kelly; Rogers, Clifford J (eds.). The Bergerac Campaign (1345) and the Generalship of Henry of Lancaster. Vol. II. Woodbridge: Boydell Press. ISBN 978-1-84383-040-5. ISSN 0961-7582. Archived from the original on 9 June 2021.
- Rogers, Clifford J. (2007). Soldiers' Lives Through History. Westport: Greenwood. ISBN 978-0-313-33350-7.
- Rogers, Clifford J. (2008). "The Battle of Agincourt". In Villalon, L. J. Andrew; Donald J., Kagay (eds.). The Hundred Years' War (Part II): Different Vistas. Leiden: Brill. ISBN 978-90-474-4283-7.
- Rogers, Clifford, ed. (2010). The Oxford Encyclopedia of Medieval Warfare and Military Technology, Volume 1. New York: Oxford University Press. ISBN 978-0-85115-804-4.
- Rothero, Christopher (1981). The Armies of Crécy and Poitiers (PDF). London: Osprey Publishing. ISBN 978-0-85045-393-5. Archived from the original (PDF) on 27 February 2019.
- Schnerb, Bertrand (2007) [2005]. "Vassals, Allies and Mercenaries: the French Army before and after 1346". In Ayton, Andrew; Preston, Philip (eds.). The Battle of Crécy, 1346. Woodbridge, Suffolk: Boydell Press. pp. 265–272. ISBN 978-1-84383-115-0.
- Strickland, Matthew & Hardy, Robert (2011). The Great Warbow: From Hastings to the Mary Rose. Somerset: J. H. Haynes & Co. ISBN 978-0-85733-090-1.
- Sumption, Jonathan (1990). The Hundred Years War 1: Trial by Battle. London: Faber & Faber. ISBN 978-0-571-13895-1.
- Wagner, John A. (2006). Encyclopedia of the Hundred Years War (PDF). Westport, CT: Greenwood Press. ISBN 978-0-313-32736-0. Archived from the original (PDF) on 16 July 2018.
- Wailly, Henri de (1987). Crécy 1346: Anatomy of a Battle. Poole, Dorset: Blandford Press. ISBN 978-0-7137-1930-7.
