= Yazutsu =

Yazutsu (矢筒, lit. the "[Japanese] Arrow Barrel") or Yadzutsu is a type of arrow quiver used in kyūdō, Japanese archery, using the Japanese longbow, the Yumi. It is generally cylindrical in shape, and zippered at the top, and appears something like a cylindrical holder of plans.

As kyūdō ya (arrows) are quite long, the yazutsu is quite long compared to quivers from other styles of archery.

Traditional yazutsu are made of cloth/satin or leather, modern ones are often made of synthetic material. They are often decorated with cord. In kyūdō the yazutsu is generally just used to carry the arrows to the dōjō. Once in the dōjō, they are held in the hand or placed on the ground for actual nocking and shooting.

Traditional archers may use another type of quiver, the yebira. This may be worn on the back and is also used in modern ceremonial archery.

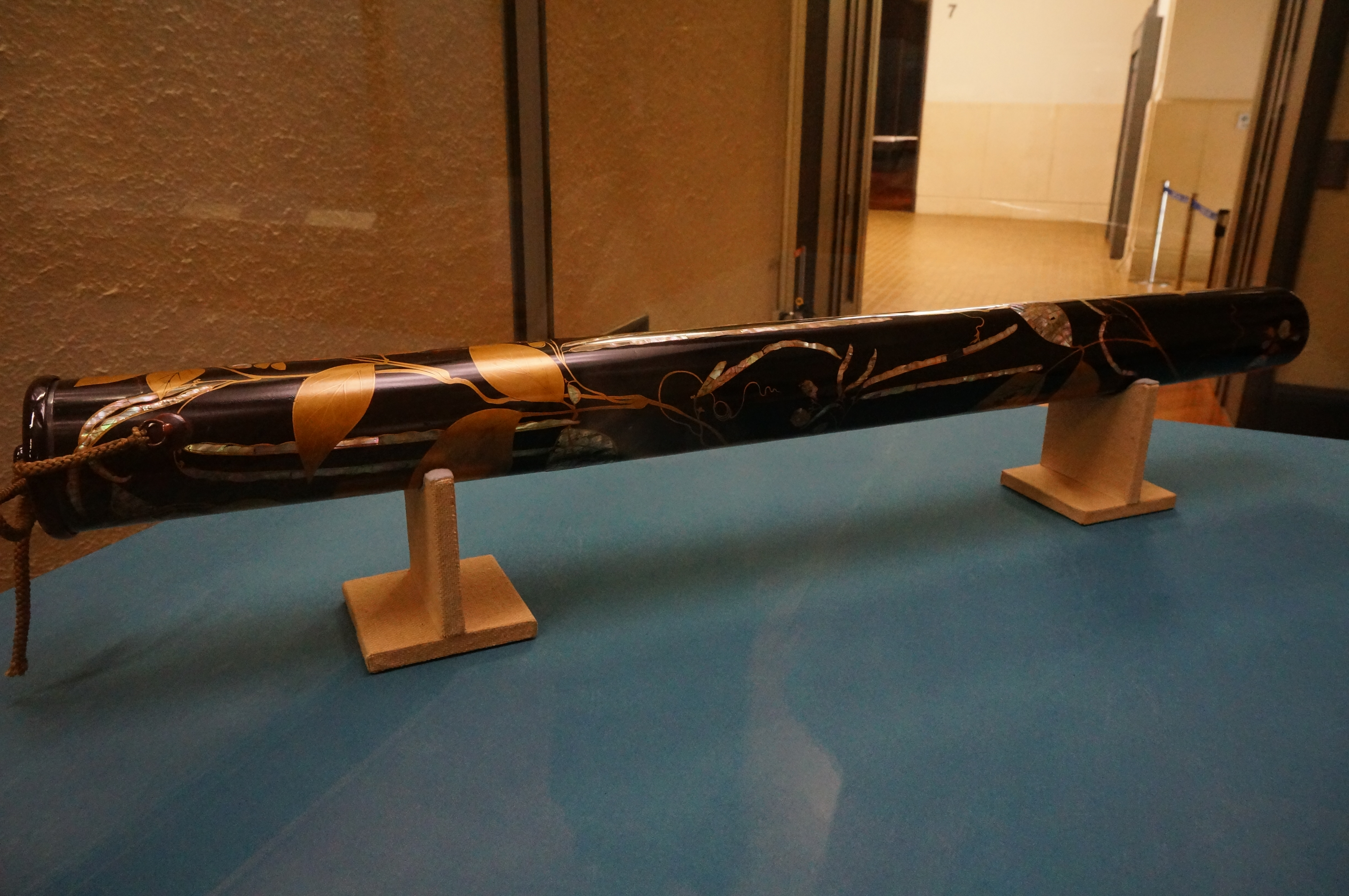
A yazutsu decorated with maki-e. Edo period, 18th century. Tokyo National Museum.

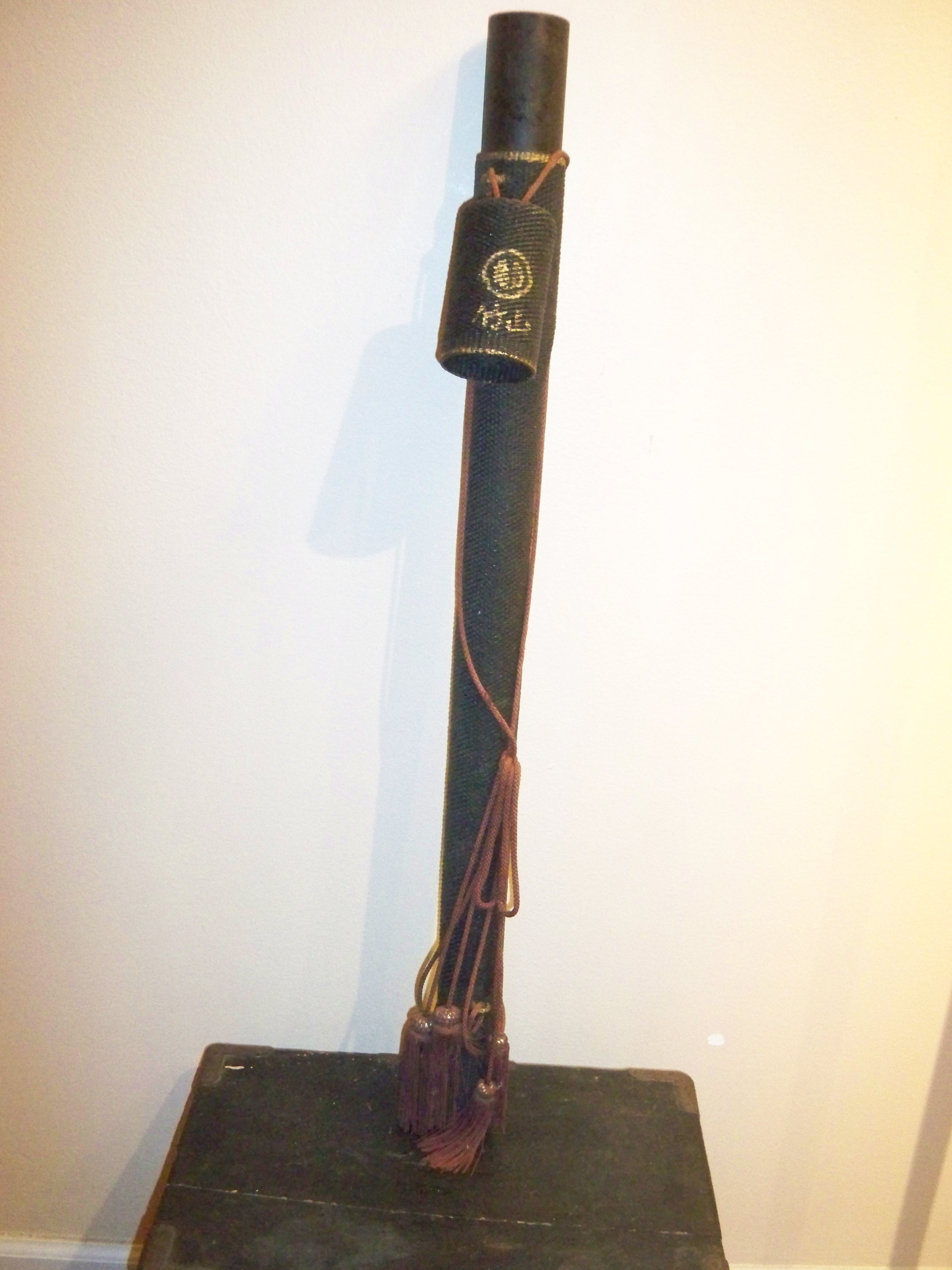
