= Yebira =

Japanese style of quiver

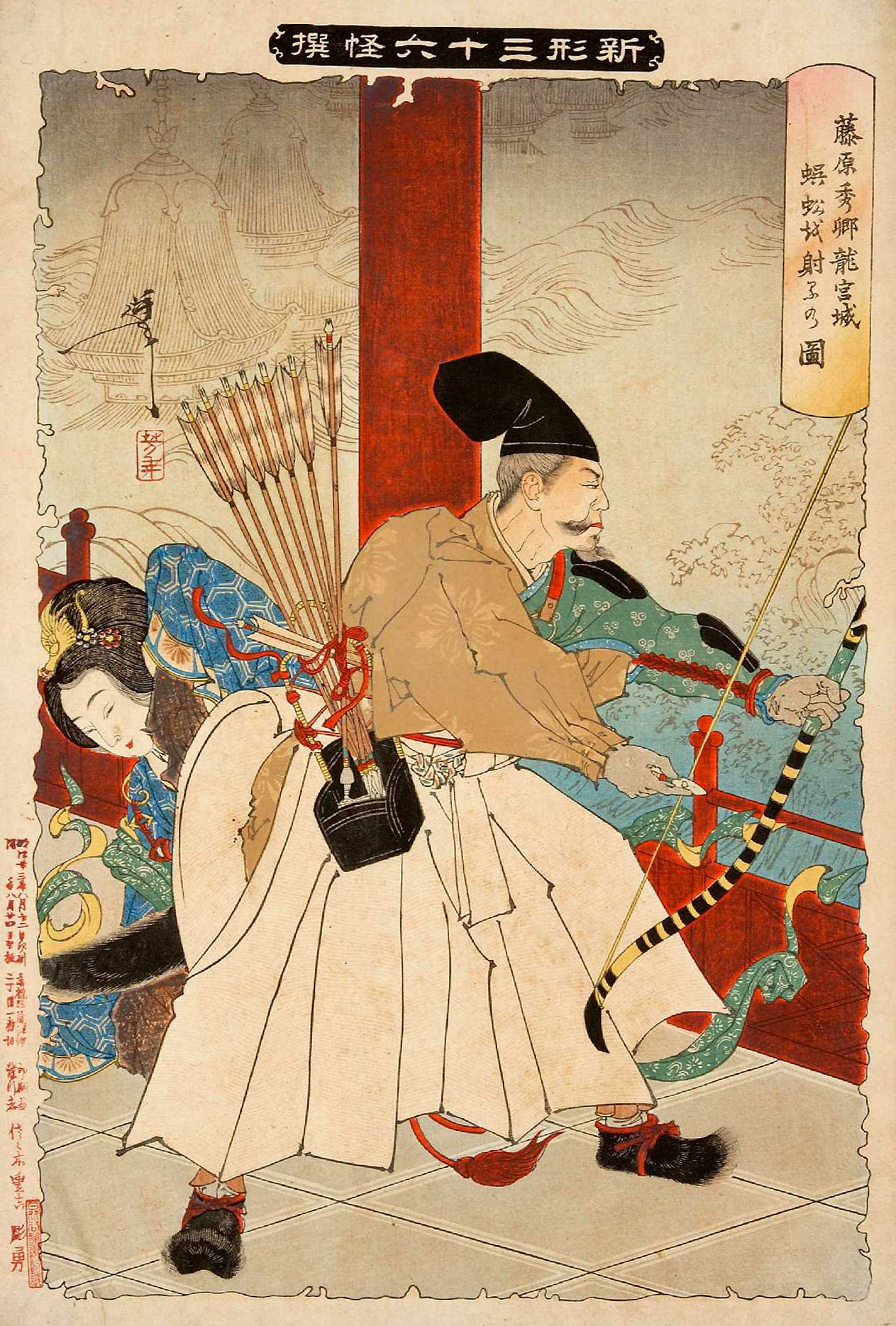
Japanese woodblock print showing a kari ebira type quiver being used

Yebira or Ebira (箙, quiver) are quivers used in Japanese archery. The quiver is unusual in that in some cases, it may have open sides, while the arrows are held in the quiver by the tips which sit on a rest at the base of the ebira, and a rib that composes the upper part and keeps them in place.

There are many types of ebira, some more ornate, some ceremonial, some more plain. Other types of ebira are more substantial and more boxlike, much like quivers from other countries. The ebira was used traditionally by samurai in combat or hunting, and also is used for ceremonial archery in modern-day Japan, such as in yabusame. It could be quite decorative. It is completely different from the cylindrical yazutsu, which is used only for carrying Kyūdō arrows. Some ebira could hold up to three dozen arrows.

The ebira can be slung over the back, or kept on saddle by horse archers.

== Gallery ==
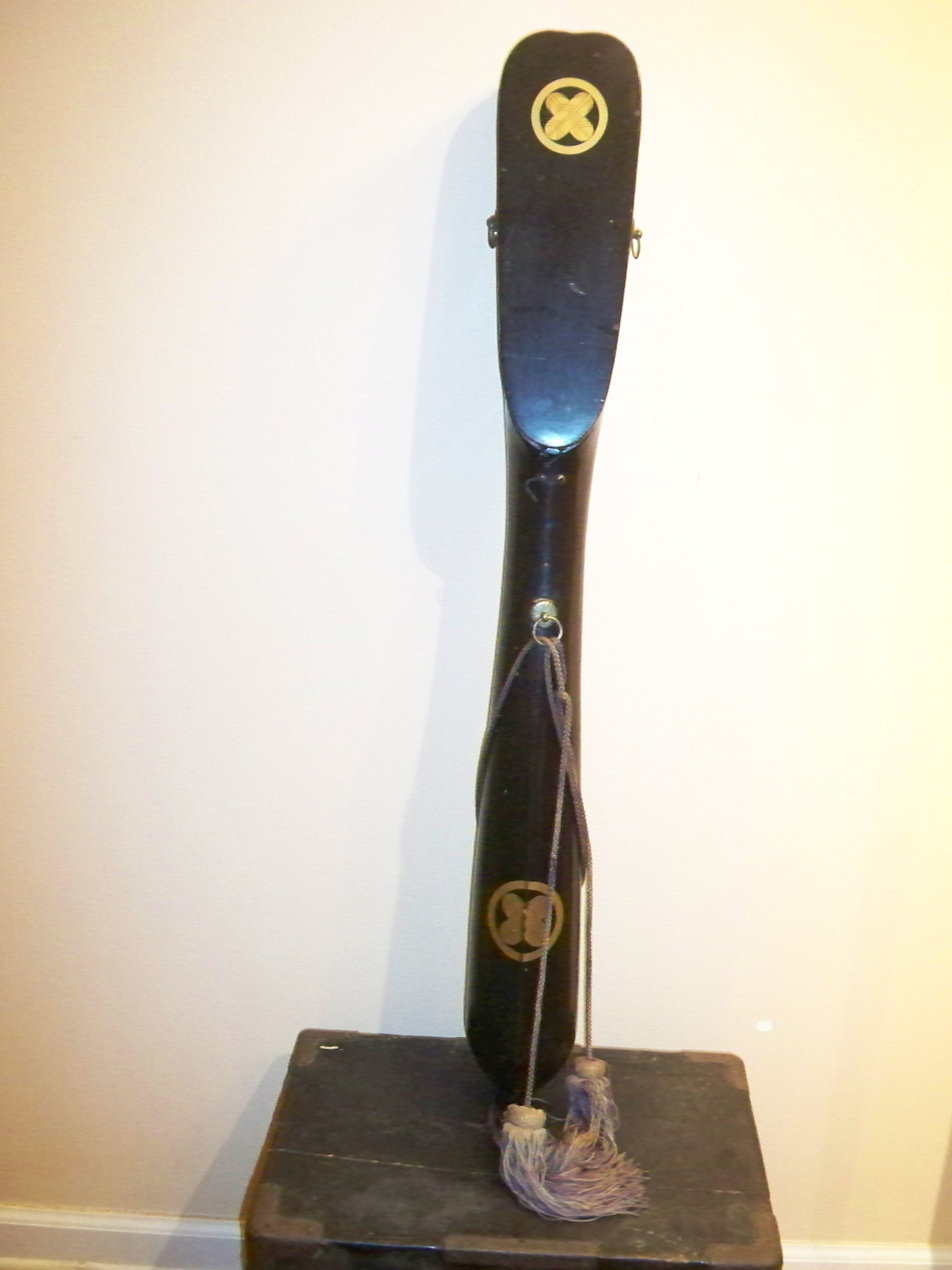
Utsubo type quiver

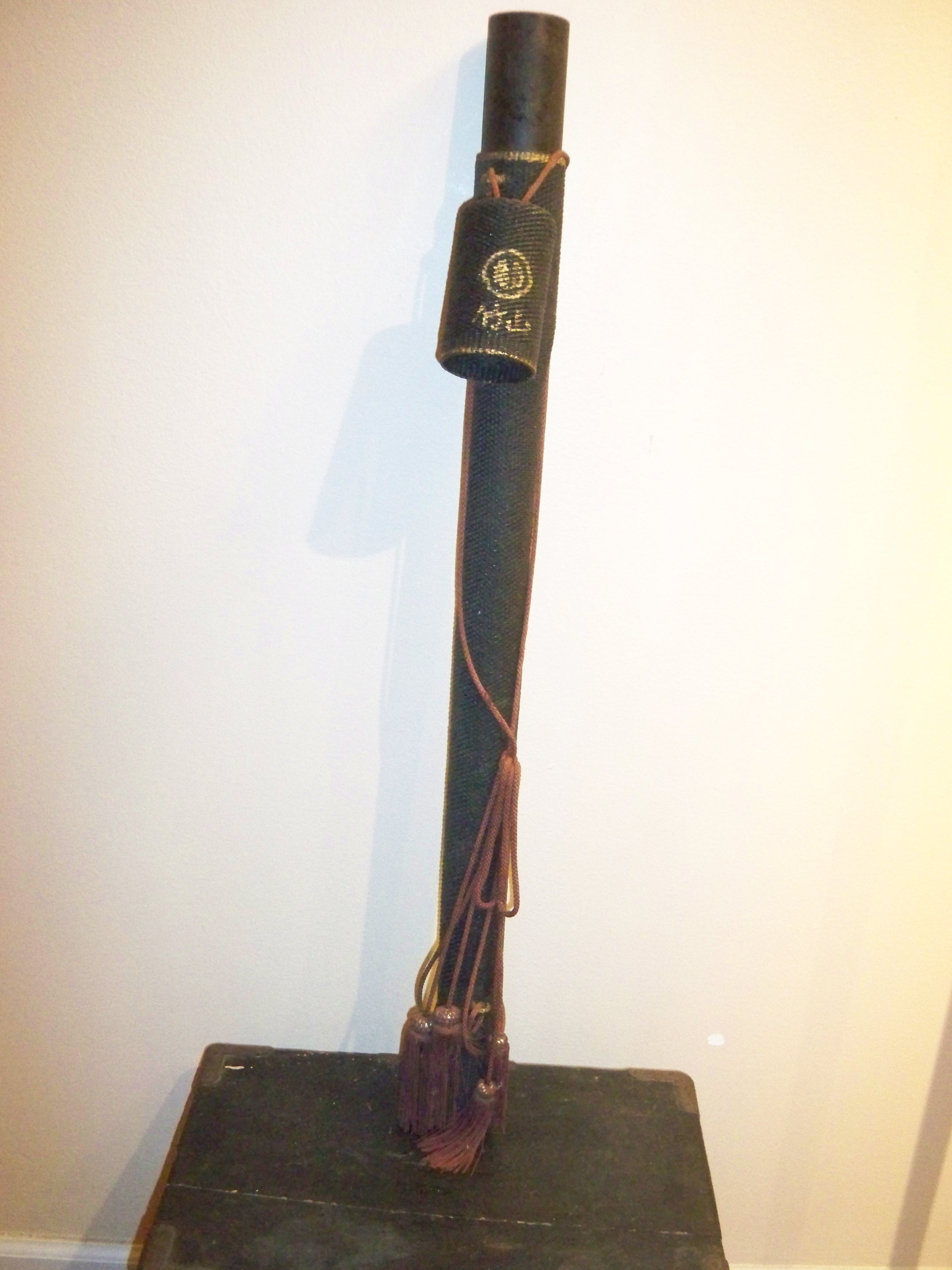
Yazutsu or yadzutsu type quiver

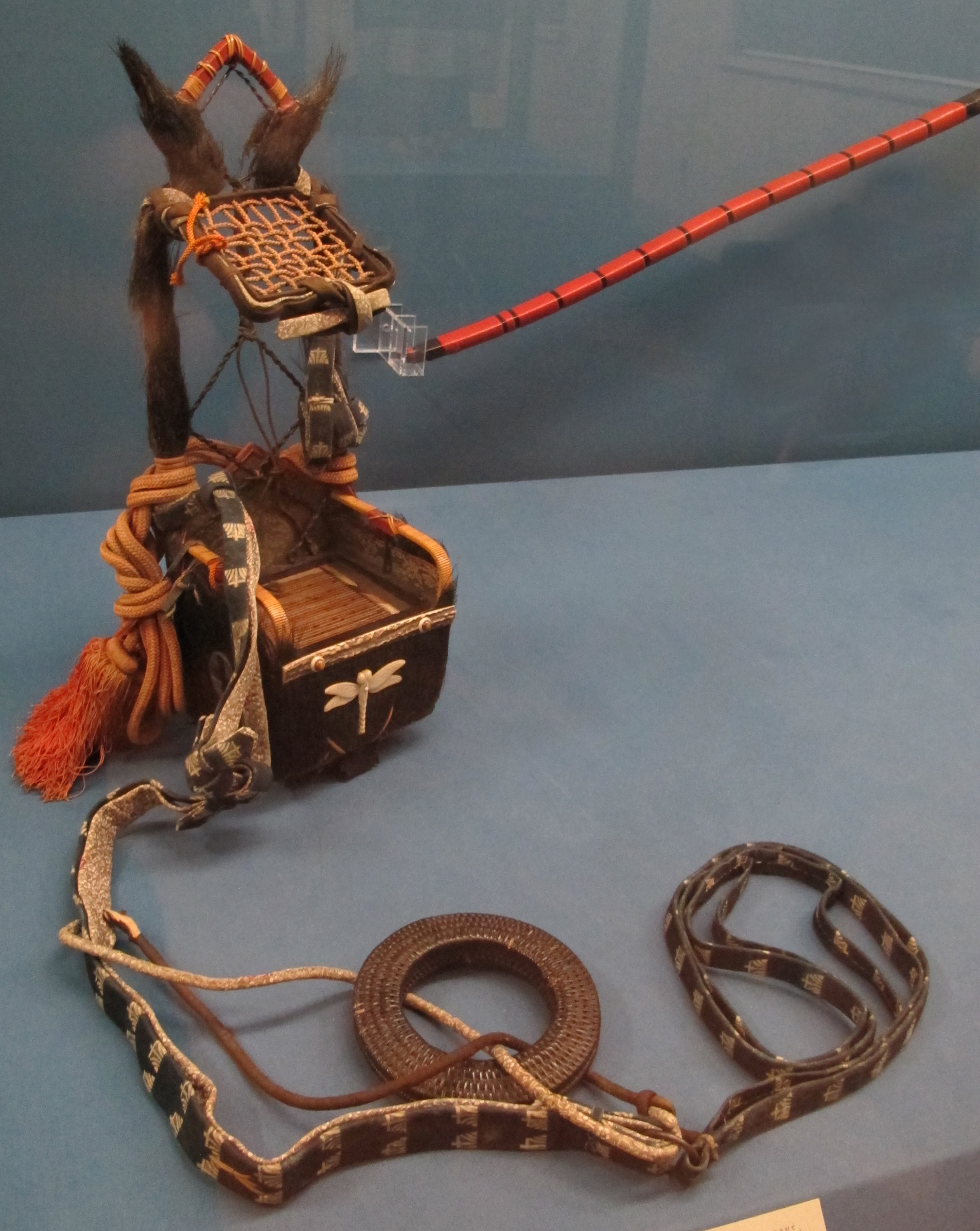
Sakatsura ebira (a fur-covered quiver armchair type ebira)

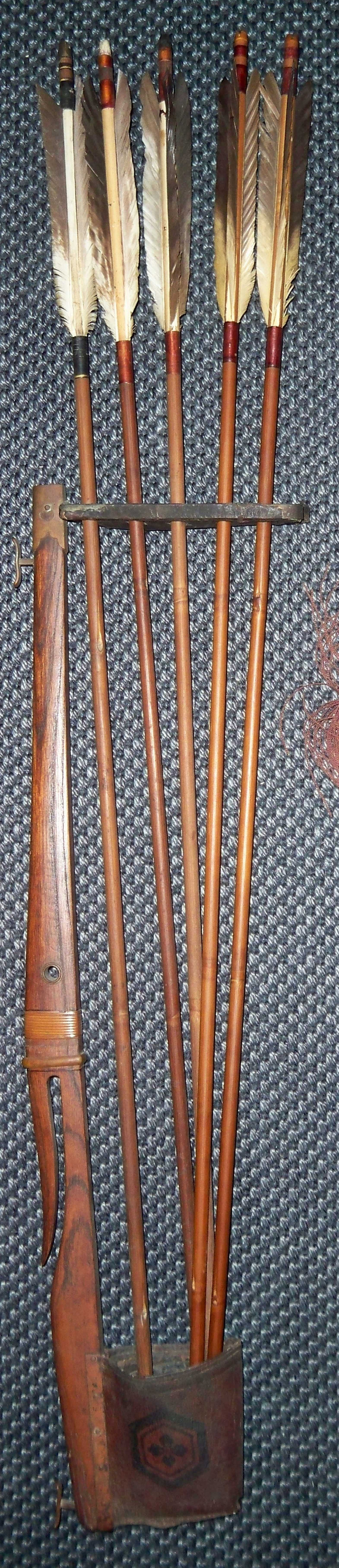
Shiko type quiver

== See also ==
- Yazutsu
- Ya (arrow)
- Yumi
