= Blanchetaque =

Ford crossing in Northern France

Coordinates: 50.13°N 1.726°E

Blanchetaque (French pronunciation: [blɑ̃ʃtak]) is a former ford crossing of the River Somme, in the Somme department in Hauts-de-France in northern France. The name of the ford is derived from the white stones marking the way across the river. Saigneville was on the southern side of the ford, before the construction of the Canal de la Somme. The ford was the site of the Battle of Blanchetaque in 1346, during the Hundred Years' War, between an army of King Edward III of England and a French force led by Godemar I du Fay.
