= Antonio Doria =

Admiral of France (died 1346)

Antonio Doria (Note: Also Aithone Doria or Ottone Doria) was one of the leaders of Ghibellines and Genoa, who became an Admiral of France, in 1339. He died on 26 August 1346.

== Biography ==
Antonio Doria was one of the leaders of the Ghibellines in Genoa, whilst Charles of Monaco was in the Guelph party. During 1338, Philip VI of Valois had contracted for 20 galleys armed by the Ghibellines of Genoa and 20 other armed by the Guelphs of Monaco to serve in the French fleet.

Antonio Doria was in command of the 40 galleys. He is known as Aithon Doria in the General history of the Maison de France of father Anselme.

Antonio Doria was created Admiral of France in 1339.

He died at the Battle of Crécy on 26 August 1346.
