= Wadicourt =

Settlement in France

Coordinates: 50°16′N 1°54′E

Wadicourt is a village in the Somme department in Hauts-de-France in northern France, located south of Calais. It is part of the commune of Dompierre-sur-Authie. The Battle of Crécy was fought on a ridge between Wadicourt and Crécy-en-Ponthieu in 1346.
