= Godemar I du Fay =

French nobleman

- Died: 1350
- Father: Étienne Blanc, Lord of Reveux and Du Fay
- Mother: Agnès de Varennes

Godemar I du Fay (died 1350) was a 14th century French noble.

== Life ==
Du Fay was the son of Étienne Blanc, Lord of Reveux and Du Fay and Agnès de Varennes. Fay was appointed in 1328, the Baille of Vitry. in 1330 the Baille of Chaumont and in 1338 as the Governor of Tournai and Baille of Lille. He was the Baille of Vermandois during 1341-1342 and again in 1345-1346. While in command of a French force guarding the ford at Blanchetaque, 10 miles (16 km) from the sea on 24 August 1346, he was involved in the Battle of Blanchetaque. King Edward III of England was attempting to cross the River Somme and encountered the blocking force under Fay. Upon the waning of the tide, a force of English longbowmen marched part way across the ford, and, standing in the water, engaged a force of mercenary crossbowmen, whose fire they were able to suppress. A French cavalry force attempted to push back the longbowmen, but were in turn attacked by English knights. After a disorderly melee in the river, the French were pushed back, with more English troops joining the fight, with the result that the French broke and fled to Abbeville. French casualties were reported as over half of their force, while English losses were light. Du Fay was seriously wounded, but escaped.

Du Fay was appointed Baille of Sens in 1347 and Seneschal of Beaucaire in 1348. He died in 1350.

== Marriage and issue ==
Du Fay married firstly Agathe, daughter of Guy D'Albon and Marguerite d'Oingt, they had the following known issue:

- Étienne du Fay, married Phillippine de Clermont, had issue.

He married secondly Marie, daughter of Jean III de Choiseul and Alix de Grancey, they had the following known issue:

- Godemar II du Fay, married Marguerite de Bauffremont, had issue.
