= Battle of Blanchetaque =

Battle during the Hundred Years' War

- Part of the Crécy campaign during the Hundred Years' War
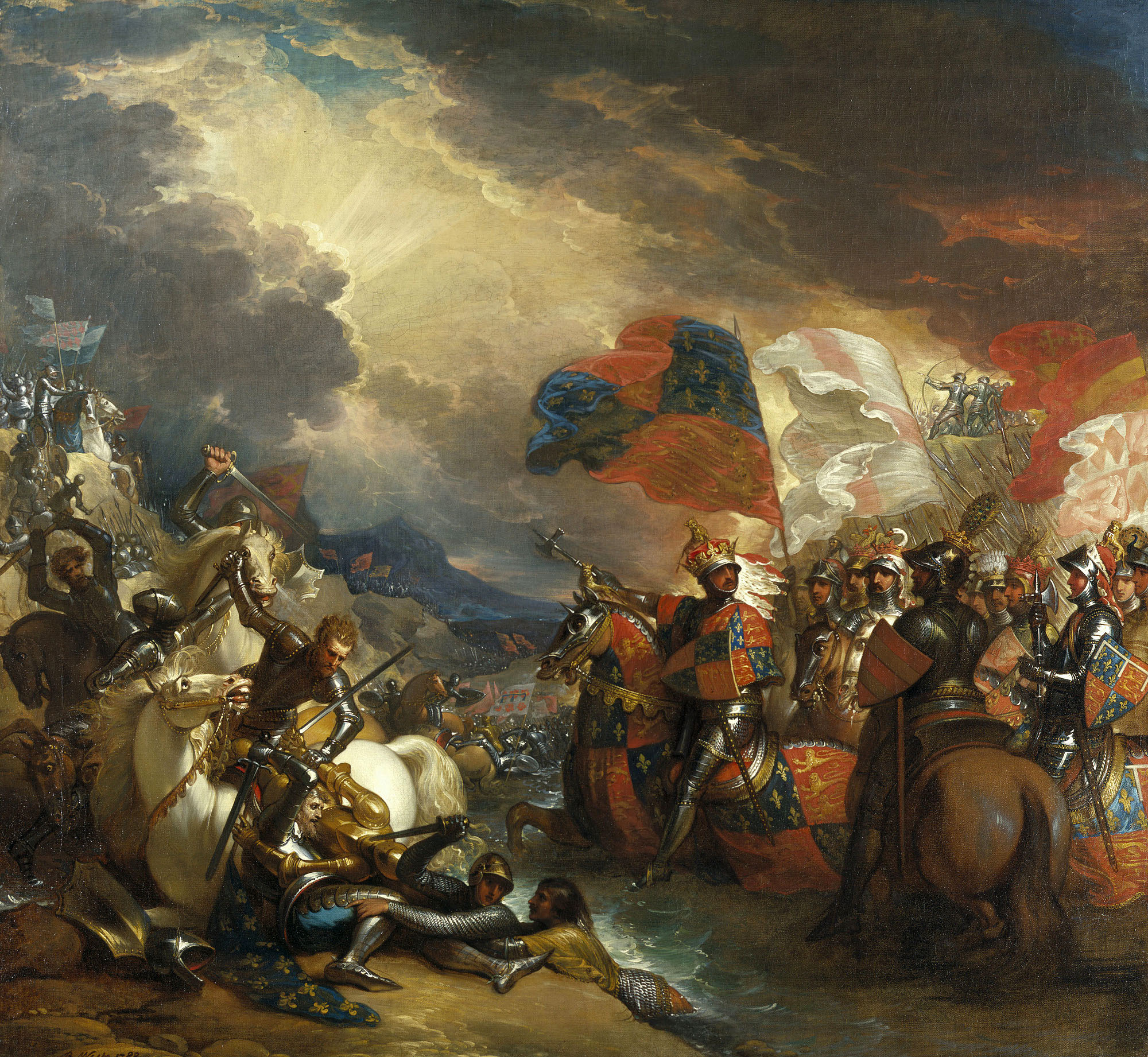
- Edward III Crossing the Somme by Benjamin West, 1788
Date	24 August 1346
Location	Blanchetaque, River Somme, near Abbeville 50°09′43″N 1°44′57″E
Result	English victory

Belligerents
Kingdom of England	Kingdom of France

Commanders and leaders
Edward III of England Edward the Black Prince	Godemar I du Fay

Strength
5,000 (not all engaged)	3,500

Casualties and losses
Light	c. 2,000

The location of some places mentioned in the text, shown within modern Hauts-de-France

Site of a battle mentioned in the text

Fortified town mentioned in the text

The Battle of Blanchetaque was fought on 24 August 1346 between an English army under King Edward III and a French force commanded by Godemar du Fay. The battle was part of the Crécy campaign, which took place during the early stages of the Hundred Years' War. After landing in the Cotentin Peninsula on 12 July, the English army had burnt a path of destruction through some of the richest lands in France to within 20 miles (32 km) of Paris, sacking a number of towns on the way. The English then marched north, hoping to link up with an allied Flemish army which had invaded from Flanders. They were outmanoeuvred by the French king, Philip VI, who garrisoned all of the bridges and fords over the River Somme and followed the English with his own field army. The area had previously been stripped of food stocks by the French, and the English were essentially trapped.

Hearing of a ford at Blanchetaque, 10 miles (16 km) from the sea, Edward marched for it and encountered the blocking force under du Fay. Once the ebbing tide had lowered the water level, a force of English longbowmen marched partway across the ford and, standing in the water, engaged a force of mercenary crossbowmen, whose shooting they were able to suppress. A French cavalry force attempted to push back the longbowmen but were in turn attacked by English men-at-arms. After a mêlée in the river, the French were pushed back, more English troops were fed into the fight, and the French broke and fled. French casualties were reported as over half of their force, while English losses were light. Two days after Blanchetaque, the main French army under Philip was defeated at the Battle of Crécy with heavy loss of life. Edward ended the campaign by laying siege to Calais, which fell after twelve months, securing an English entrepôt into northern France which was held for two hundred years.

== Background ==
Since the Norman Conquest of 1066, English monarchs had held titles and lands within France, the possession of which made them vassals of the kings of France. The status of the English king's French fiefs was a major source of conflict between the two kingdoms throughout the Middle Ages. English holdings in France had varied in size over the centuries, but by 1337 only Gascony in south-western France and Ponthieu in northern France were left. Following a series of disagreements between Philip VI of France (r. 1328–1350) and Edward III of England (r. 1327–1377), Philip's Great Council in Paris on 24 May 1337 agreed that the Duchy of Aquitaine, effectively Gascony, should be taken back into Philip's hands on the grounds that Edward was in breach of his obligations as a vassal. This marked the start of the Hundred Years' War.

Early in 1345, Edward determined to attack France on three fronts: a small force would sail for Brittany; a slightly larger force would proceed to Gascony under the command of the Henry, Earl of Derby; and the main force would accompany him to either northern France or Flanders. The French anticipated, correctly, that the English planned to make their main effort in northern France. Thus, they directed what resources they had to the north, planning to assemble their main army at Arras on 22 July. South-western France and Brittany were encouraged to rely on their own resources.

The main English army sailed on 29 June 1345 and anchored off Sluys in Flanders. Edward was unexpectedly threatened with the loss of his Flemish allies, and to avoid this was forced to attend to diplomatic affairs. By 22 July, although the Flemish situation was unresolved, men and horses could be confined on board ship no longer and the fleet sailed, probably intending to land in Normandy. It was scattered by a storm, and individual ships found their way over the following week to various English ports where they disembarked. There was a further week's delay while the King and his council debated what to do, by which time it proved impossible to do anything major with the main English army before winter. Aware of this, Philip VI despatched reinforcements to Brittany and Gascony. During 1345, Derby led a whirlwind campaign through Gascony at the head of an Anglo-Gascon army. He heavily defeated two large French armies at the battles of Bergerac and Auberoche, captured French towns and fortifications in much of Périgord and most of Agenais, and gave the English possessions in Gascony strategic depth.

John, Duke of Normandy, the son and heir of Philip VI, was placed in charge of all French forces in south-west France. In March 1346 a French army numbering between 15,000 and 20,000, enormously superior to any force the Anglo-Gascons could field, including all the military officers of the royal household, marched on Gascony. They besieged the strategically and logistically important town of Aiguillon, "the key to the Gascon plain", on 1 April. On 2 April the arrière-ban, the formal call to arms for all able-bodied males, was announced for the south of France. French financial, logistical and manpower efforts were focused on this offensive.

Meanwhile, Edward was raising a fresh army, and assembled more than 700 vessels to transport it – the largest English fleet ever to that date. The French were aware of Edward's efforts, but given the extreme difficulty of disembarking an army other than at a port, and the existence of friendly ports in Brittany and Gascony, the French assumed that Edward would sail for one of the latter – probably Gascony – to relieve Aiguillon. To guard against any possibility of an English landing in northern France, Philip relied on his powerful navy. This reliance was misplaced given the difficulty naval forces of the time had in effectively interdicting opposing fleets, and the French were unable to prevent Edward successfully crossing the Channel.

== Prelude ==
The campaign began on 11 July 1346, when Edward's fleet departed the south of England. The fleet landed the next day at Saint-Vaast-la-Hougue, 20 miles (32 km) from Cherbourg. The English army is estimated by modern historians to have been some 15,000 strong and consisted of both English and Welsh soldiers combined with a number of German and Breton mercenaries and allies. It included at least one Norman baron who was unhappy with the rule of Philip VI. The English achieved complete strategic surprise and marched south. Edward's aim was to conduct a chevauchée, a large-scale raid, across French territory to reduce his opponent's morale and wealth. His soldiers razed every town in their path and looted whatever they could from the populace. The towns of Carentan, Saint-Lô and Torteval were destroyed as the army passed, along with many other smaller places. The English fleet paralleled the army's route, devastating the country for up to 5 miles (8 km) inland and taking vast amounts of loot; many ships deserted, having filled their holds. They also captured or burnt over 100 French ships, 61 of which had been converted into military vessels. Caen, the cultural, political, religious and financial centre of north-west Normandy, was stormed on 26 July and subsequently looted for five days. The English marched out towards the River Seine on 1 August.

Map of the route of Edward III's chevauchée of 1346

The French military position was difficult. Their main army was committed to the intractable siege of Aiguillon in the south-west. After his surprise landing in Normandy, Edward was devastating some of the richest lands in France and flaunting his ability to march at will through France. On 2 August, a small English force supported by a large number of Flemings invaded France from Flanders. French defences were completely inadequate. On 29 July, Philip proclaimed the arrière-ban for northern France, ordering every able-bodied male to assemble at Rouen, where Philip himself arrived on the 31st. He immediately moved west against Edward with an ill-organised and poorly-equipped army. Five days later he returned to Rouen and broke the bridge over the Seine behind him. On 7 August, the English reached the Seine, 12 miles (19 km) south of Rouen, and raided up to its suburbs. Philip, under pressure from representatives of the Pope, sent envoys offering peace backed by a marriage alliance; Edward replied that he was not prepared to lose marching time to futile discussion and dismissed them. By 12 August, Edward's army was encamped at Poissy, 20 miles from Paris, having left a 40-mile-wide (60 km) swath of destruction down the left bank of the Seine to within 2 miles (3 km) of the city.

On 16 August, Edward burnt down Poissy and marched north. The French had carried out a scorched earth policy, carrying away all stores of food and so forcing the English to spread out over a wide area to forage, which greatly slowed them. Bands of French peasants attacked some of the smaller groups of foragers. Philip reached the River Somme a day's march ahead of Edward. He based himself at Amiens and sent large detachments to hold every bridge and ford across the Seine between Amiens and the sea. The English were now trapped in an area which had been stripped of food. The French moved out of Amiens and advanced westwards, towards the English. They were now willing to give battle, knowing that they would have the advantage of being able to stand on the defensive while the English were forced to try and fight their way past them.

Edward was determined to break the French blockade of the Somme and probed at several points, vainly attacking Hangest and Pont-Remy before moving west along the river. English supplies were running out and the army was ragged, starving and beginning to suffer from a drop in morale. On the evening of 24 August, the English were encamped north of Acheux while the French were 6 miles (10 km) away at Abbeville. During the night Edward was made aware, either by an Englishman living locally or by a French captive, that just 4 miles (6 km) away, near the village of Saigneville, was a ford named Blanchetaque (so named for the white stones lining the river's bed). Edward immediately broke camp and moved his whole force toward the ford.

== Battle ==
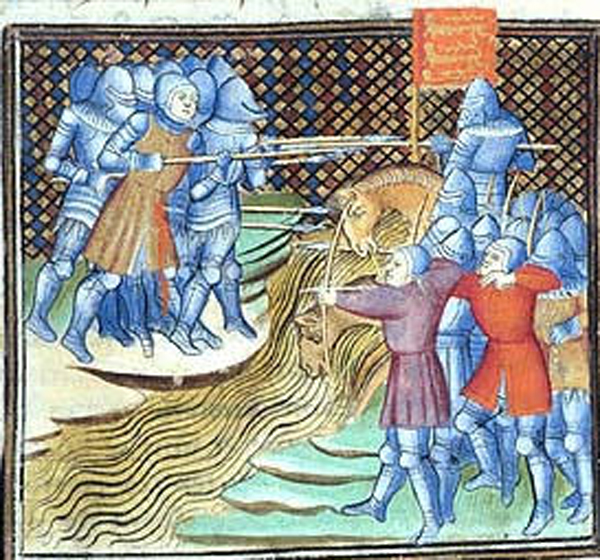
The Battle of Blanchetaque, as depicted in a 14th-century manuscript of Froissart's Chronicles

When the English arrived at the river they discovered that the French had defended the ford strongly. Guarding the far side of the crossing were 3,500 soldiers, including 500 men-at-arms and an unknown number of mercenary crossbowmen under Godemar du Fay, an experienced French general. A contemporary chronicler described this as an elite unit. The ford was 2,000 yards (1,800 m) wide and as it was only 10 miles (16 km) from the coast, it was strongly tidal, only passable for a few hours twice each day. When the English arrived at dawn, the tide was high and not expected to drop to crossable levels for several hours. The French force was drawn up in three lines along the sloping north bank, with the best soldiers, the 500 men-at-arms, positioned in the centre.

At about 9 a.m., a force of English longbowmen, led by Hugh, Baron Despenser, started across the ford, 12 abreast on the narrow causeway. They came under crossbow shot, but continued until the water was shallow enough for them to be able to reply. The numbers shooting from each side at this stage are not known, but the longbowmen had the advantages that those to the rear were able to send arrows over the heads of those in front of them, and that they could shoot three times faster than the crossbowmen. The English archery proved more effective than the French crossbow shot. As their crossbowmen were overcome, some French men-at-arms mounted and entered the river in an attempt to ride down the longbowmen. The English had their own force of mounted men-at-arms standing in the river behind their longbowmen, probably led by William, Earl of Northampton, and seeing the French mounting, they made their way through and around the ranks of archers and engaged the French on the water's edge in a disorderly mêlée.

The opposing cavalry, having moved into contact at walking pace, suffered few casualties. The greater pressure of the English forced the mêlée onto the French bank of the river. The dismounted French men-at-arms were pushed back by the mass of retreating French and advancing English men-at-arms, making space for the English longbowmen to gain the riverbank. The longbowmen were themselves being forced forward by more English cavalry advancing behind them. More and more English were fed into the bridgehead and after a short, sharp struggle, the French broke, fleeing for Abbeville, 6 miles (10 km) away. It seems that most of the knightly and noble French participants, being mounted, successfully escaped. The French infantry were unable to outrun the pursuing English cavalry and suffered heavy casualties. As was usual, no quarter was offered to the common soldiers. Du Fay was seriously wounded, but escaped.

An hour and a half after the French lines had broken, the entire English army was across the ford. The main French army was close enough behind them to capture a number of English stragglers and the slower of their wagons. However, the tide was turning, and the French halted, facing the English across the river for the rest of the 24th, debating whether to attempt to force the crossing at the evening low tide. They decided not to and on the morning of the 25th backtracked to the bridge at Abbeville, a 12-mile diversion. Casualties in the action are not clear, but it is claimed by a contemporary chronicler that as many as 2,000 French soldiers were killed in the battle or the rout which followed it. English losses are not known but were probably light.

== Aftermath ==
Once the French withdrew, Edward marched the 9 miles (14 km) to Crécy-en-Ponthieu where he prepared a defensive position. The French had been so confident that the English could not breach the Somme line that they had not denuded the area, and the countryside was rich in food and loot. So the English were able to resupply, Noyelles-sur-Mer and Le Crotoy in particular yielding large stores of food, which were looted and the towns then burnt. On 26 August the main French army under Philip was crushingly defeated here at the Battle of Crécy with heavy loss of life. Edward ended the campaign by laying siege to Calais, which fell after twelve months, securing an English entrepôt into northern France which was held for two hundred years.
