= Joseph Dahmus =

American historian (1909–2005)

Joseph Henry Dahmus (March 22, 1909 – March 7, 2005) was an American scholar of medieval history and the author of many books, including the Dictionary of Medieval Civilization (Macmillan, 1984). He was a professor at Pennsylvania State University from 1947 to 1975.

Dahmus graduated from the Pontifical College Josephinum in Columbus, Ohio, received his master's degree in the Classics from St. Louis University in St. Louis, Missouri, and earned his PhD in Medieval History from the University of Illinois at Urbana-Champaign.

His son, John W. Dahmus, is also a medieval historian and is currently a professor at Stephen F. Austin State University.

== Selected bibliography ==
- The Prosecution of John Wyclyf (1952)
- A History of Medieval Civilization (1964)
- William Courtenay: Archbishop of Canterbury (1966)
- Seven Medieval Kings (1967)
- A History of the Middle Ages (1968)
- The Middle Ages: A Popular History (1969)
- Seven Medieval Queens (1972)
- Seven Medieval Historians (1981)
- Seven Decisive Battles of the Middle Ages (1983)
- Dictionary of Medieval Civilization (1984)
- The Puzzling Gospels (1985)
