= Saigneville =

- Commune
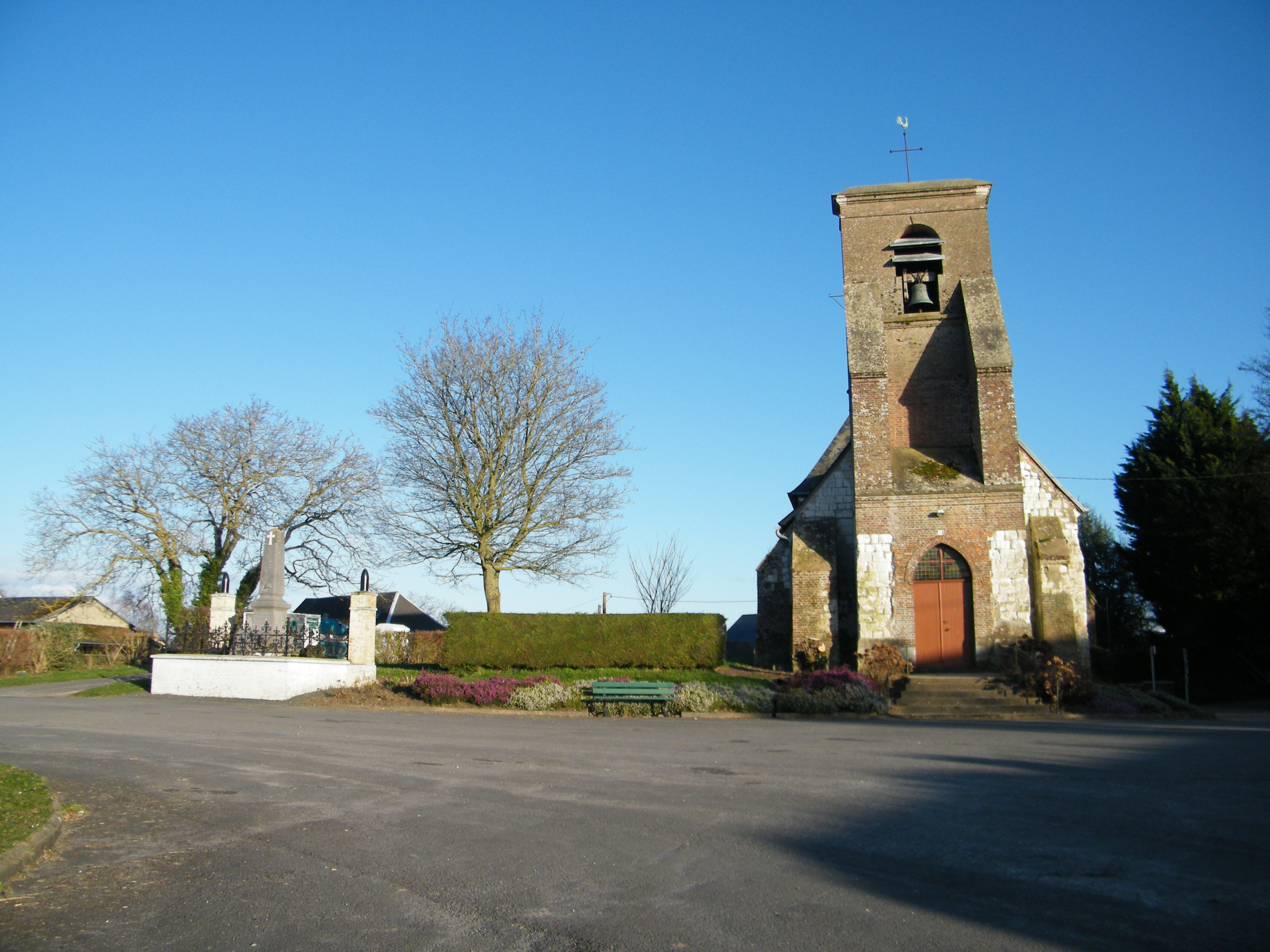
- The war memorial and church in Saigneville

- Coat of arms
- Location of Saigneville
- Location within France Location within Hauts-de-France
- Coordinates: 50°08′17″N 1°42′45″E
- Country: France
- Region: Hauts-de-France
- Department: Somme
- Arrondissement: Abbeville
- Canton: Abbeville-2
- Intercommunality: CA Baie de Somme

Government
  - Mayor (2020–2026): Jean Gorriez
- Area^{1}: 12.86 km^{2} (4.97 sq mi)
- Elevation: 30 m (98 ft)
- Highest elevation: 59 m (194 ft)
- Lowest elevation: 2 m (6.6 ft)
- Population (2023): 344
  - Density: 26.7/km^{2} (69.3/sq mi)
- Time zone: UTC+01:00 (CET)
  - Summer (DST): UTC+02:00 (CEST)
- INSEE/Postal code: 80691 /80230
- ^{1} French Land Register data, which excludes lakes, ponds, glaciers > 1 km^{2} (0.386 sq mi or 247 acres) and river estuaries.

Saigneville (French pronunciation: [sɛɲvil]) is a commune in the Somme department in Hauts-de-France in northern France.

== History ==
Prior to construction of the Canal de la Somme, Saigneville stood at the southern end of a ford across the Somme estuary. Known as Blanchetaque for the white stones marking the way, the ford became the site of the Battle of Blanchetaque in 1346, during the Hundred Years' War.

== Geography ==
Saigneville is situated 5 miles (8 km) northwest of Abbeville, on the D3 road, near the Somme canal.

== Population ==
Historical population
Year	Pop.	±% p.a.
1968	365	—
1975	330	−1.43%
1982	351	+0.89%
1990	375	+0.83%
1999	385	+0.29%
2007	398	+0.42%
2012	398	+0.00%
2017	393	−0.25%
2023	344	−2.20%
Source: INSEE

== See also ==
- Communes of the Somme department
