= Quiver =

Container for holding arrows, bolts, darts, ammo, projectiles or javelins

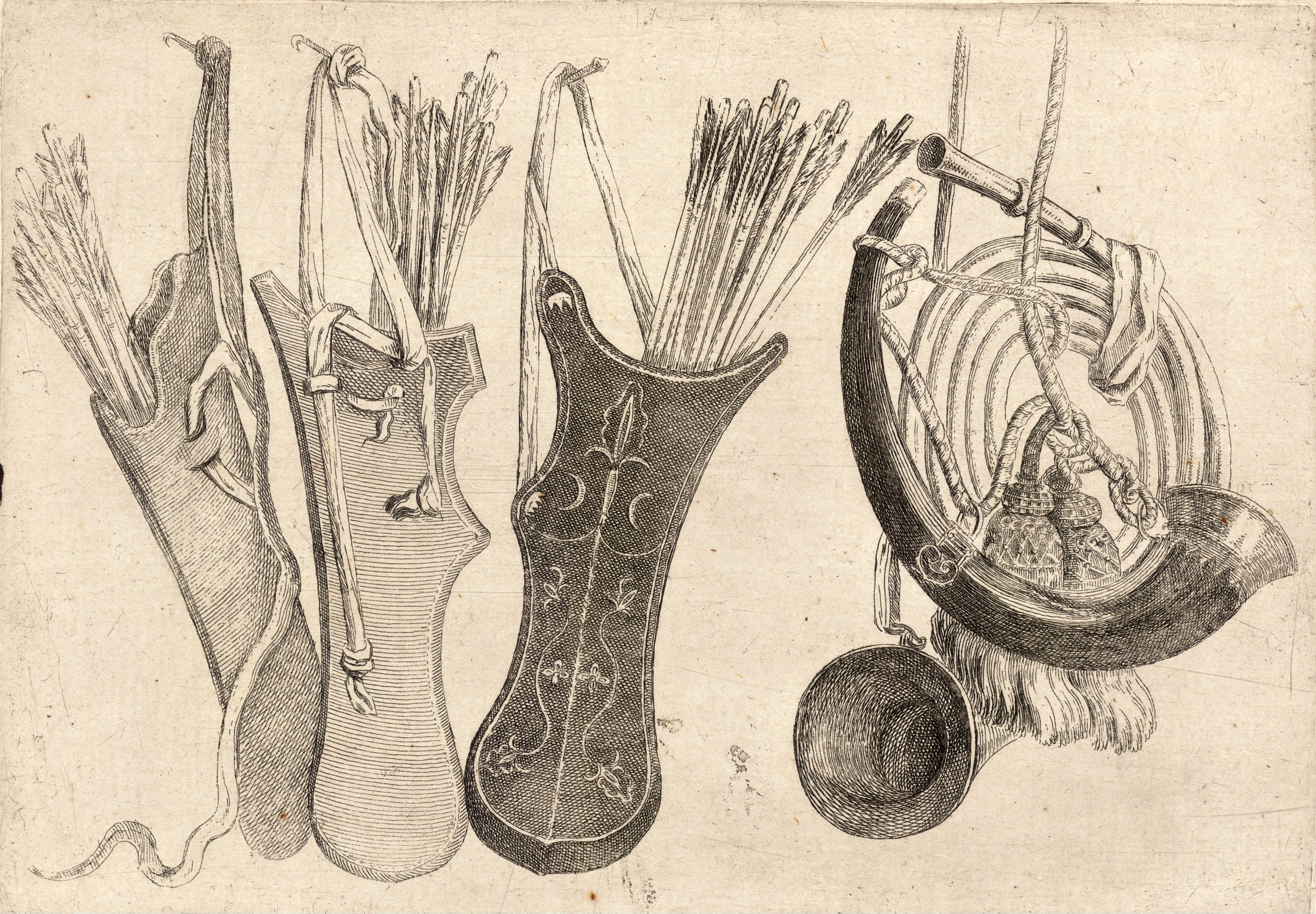
Three quivers

A quiver is a container for holding arrows or bolts. It can be carried on an archer's body, the bow, or the ground, depending on the type of shooting and the archer's personal preference. Quivers were traditionally made of leather, wood, furs, and other natural materials, but are now often made of metal or plastic.

== Etymology ==
The English word quiver has its origins in Old French, written as quivre, cuevre, or coivre.

== Types ==
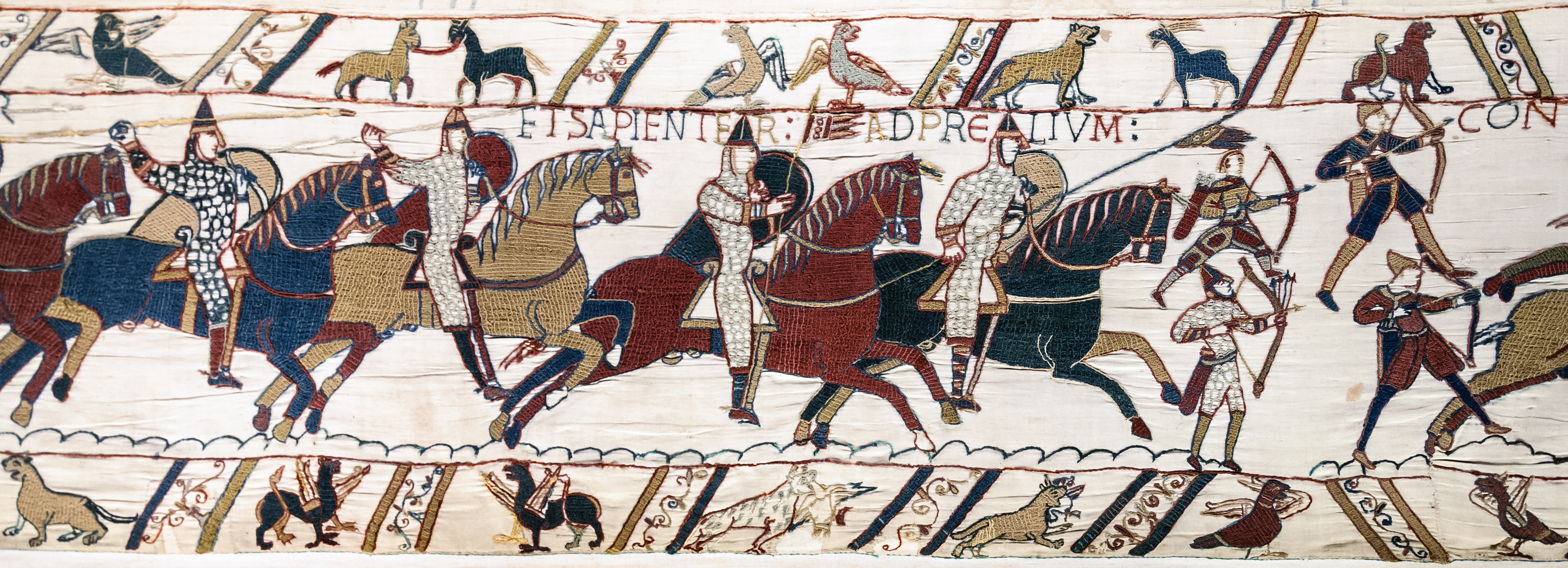
Norman archers depicted in the Bayeux Tapestry. The top left archer was caught unprepared and has hastily thrown his belt quiver about his shoulders, as well as forgetting his helmet.

=== Belt quiver ===
The most common style of quiver is a flat or cylindrical container suspended from the belt. They are found across many cultures from North America to China. Many variations of this type exist, such as being canted forwards or backwards, and being carried on the dominant hand side, off-hand side, or the small of the back. Some variants enclose almost the entire arrow, while minimalist "pocket quivers" consist of little more than a small stiff pouch that only covers the first few centimeters. The Bayeux Tapestry shows that most bowmen in medieval Europe used belt quivers.

=== Back quiver ===
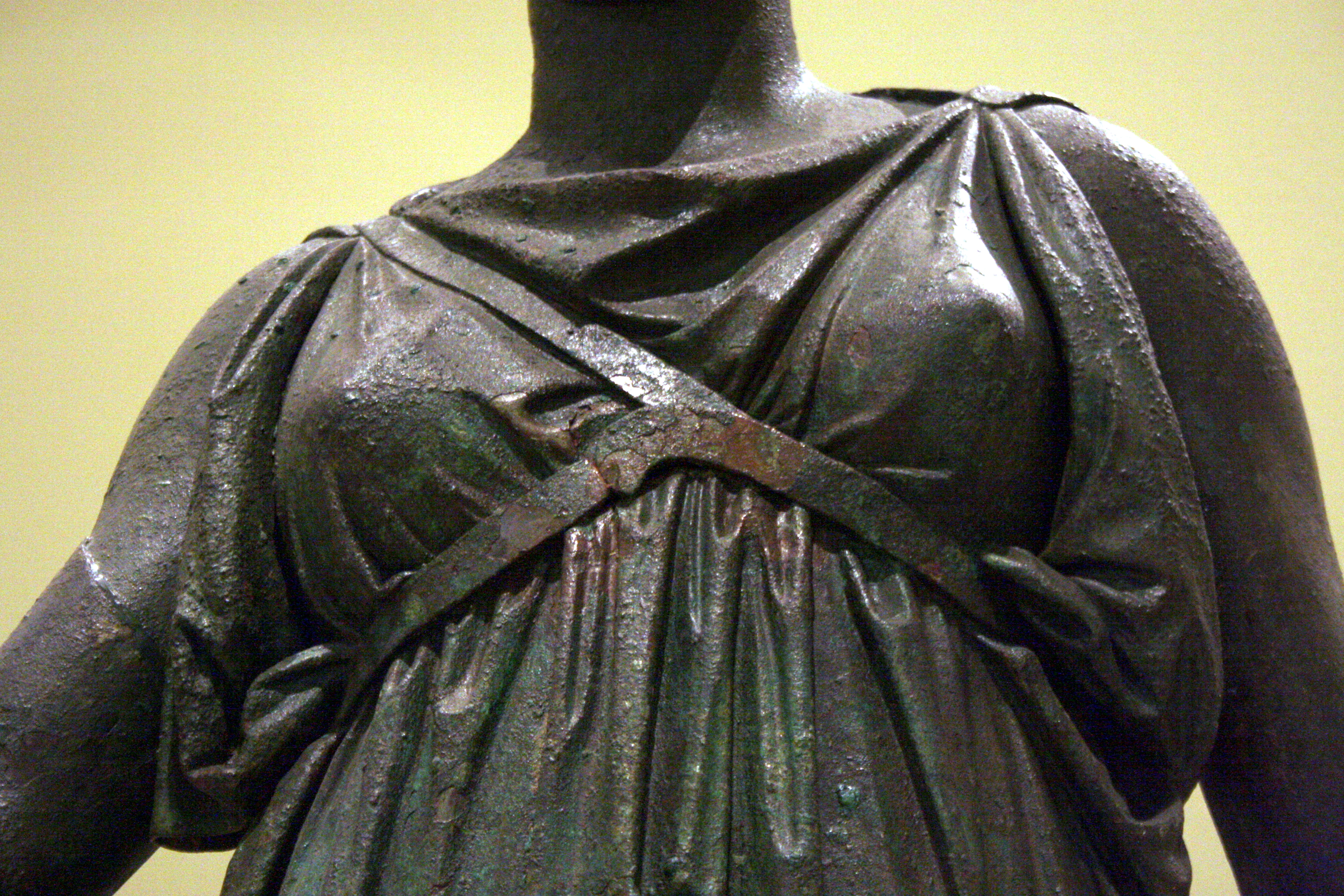
A y-shaped harness for a back quiver features on this bronze statue of Artemis, goddess of the hunt, mid-4th century BC.

Back quivers are secured to the archer's back by leather straps, with the nock ends protruding above the dominant hand's shoulder. Arrows can be drawn over the shoulder rapidly by the nock. This style of quiver was used by native peoples of North America and Africa, and was also commonly depicted in bas-reliefs from ancient Assyria. They were also used in Ancient Greece and often feature on sculptural representations of Artemis, goddess of the hunt. While popular in cinema and 20th century art for depictions of medieval European characters (such as Robin Hood), this style of quiver was rarely used in medieval Europe.

=== Ground quiver ===
A ground quiver is used for both target shooting or warfare when the archer is shooting from a fixed location. They can be simply stakes in the ground with a ring at the top to hold the arrows, or more elaborate designs that hold the arrows within reach without the archer having to lean down to draw.

=== Bow quiver ===
A modern invention, the bow quiver attaches directly to the bow's limbs and holds the arrows steady with a clip of some kind. They are popular with compound bow hunters as it allows one piece of equipment to be carried in the field without encumbering the hunter's body.

=== Arrow bag ===
A style used by medieval English longbowmen and several other cultures, an arrow bag is a simple drawstring cloth sack with a leather spacer at the top to keep the arrows divided. When not in use, the drawstring could be closed, completely covering the arrows so as to protect them from rain and dirt. Some had straps or rope sewn to them for carrying, but many either were tucked into the belt or set on the ground before battle to allow easier access.

=== Japanese quivers ===
Yebira refers to a variety of quiver designs. The Yazutsu is a different type, used in Kyudo. Their main use is to transport and protect arrows.

== Gallery ==
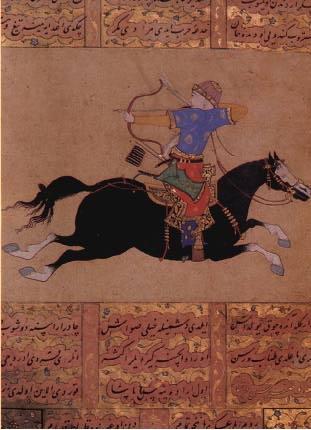
An Ottoman Turk with a rear-canted belt quiver designed for mounted archery

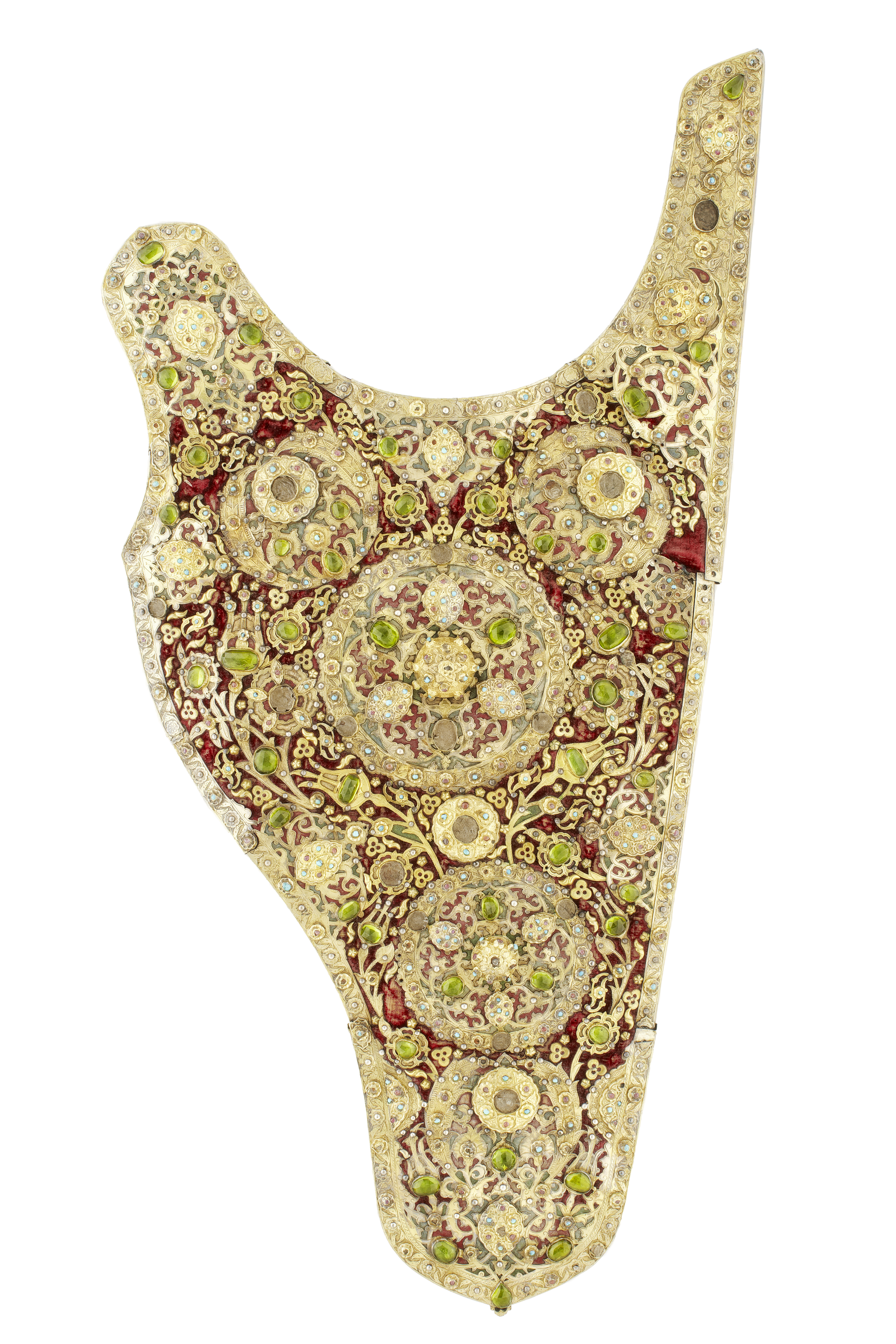
Quiver from Turkey, 1620s.

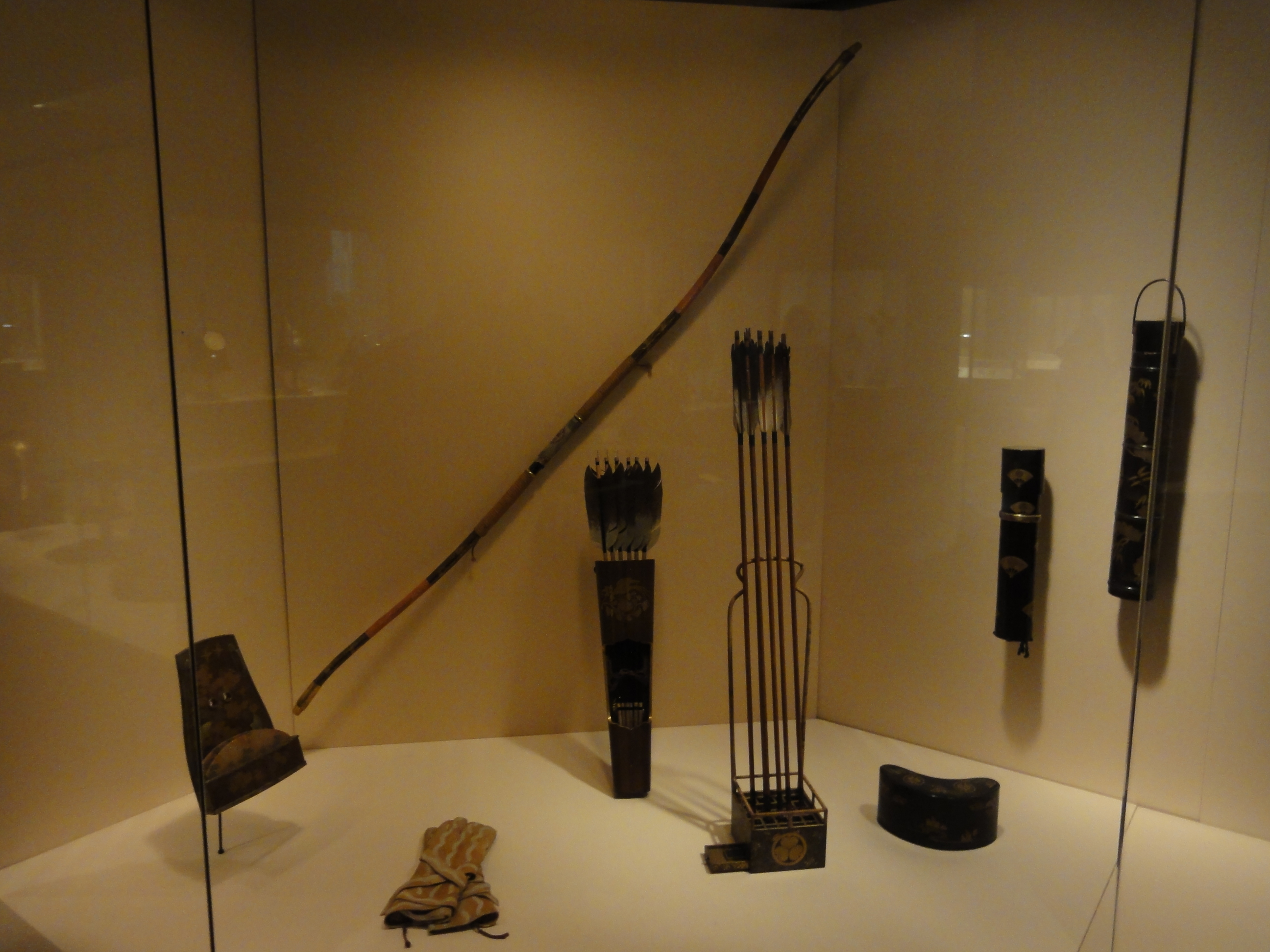
Japanese archery equipment including a variety of quivers

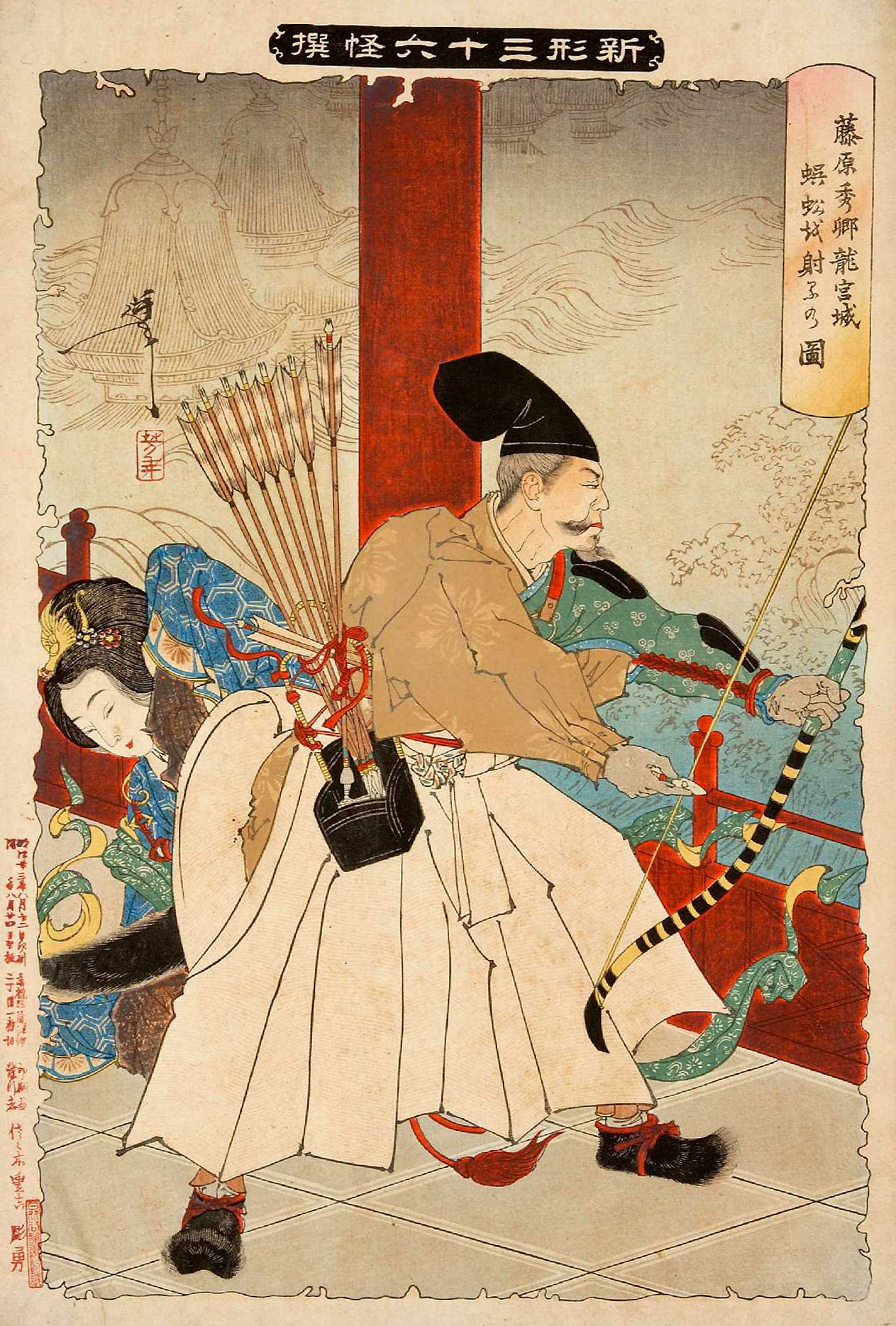
Fujiwara no Hidesato shooting the giant centipede (Tsukioka Yoshitoshi, 1890)

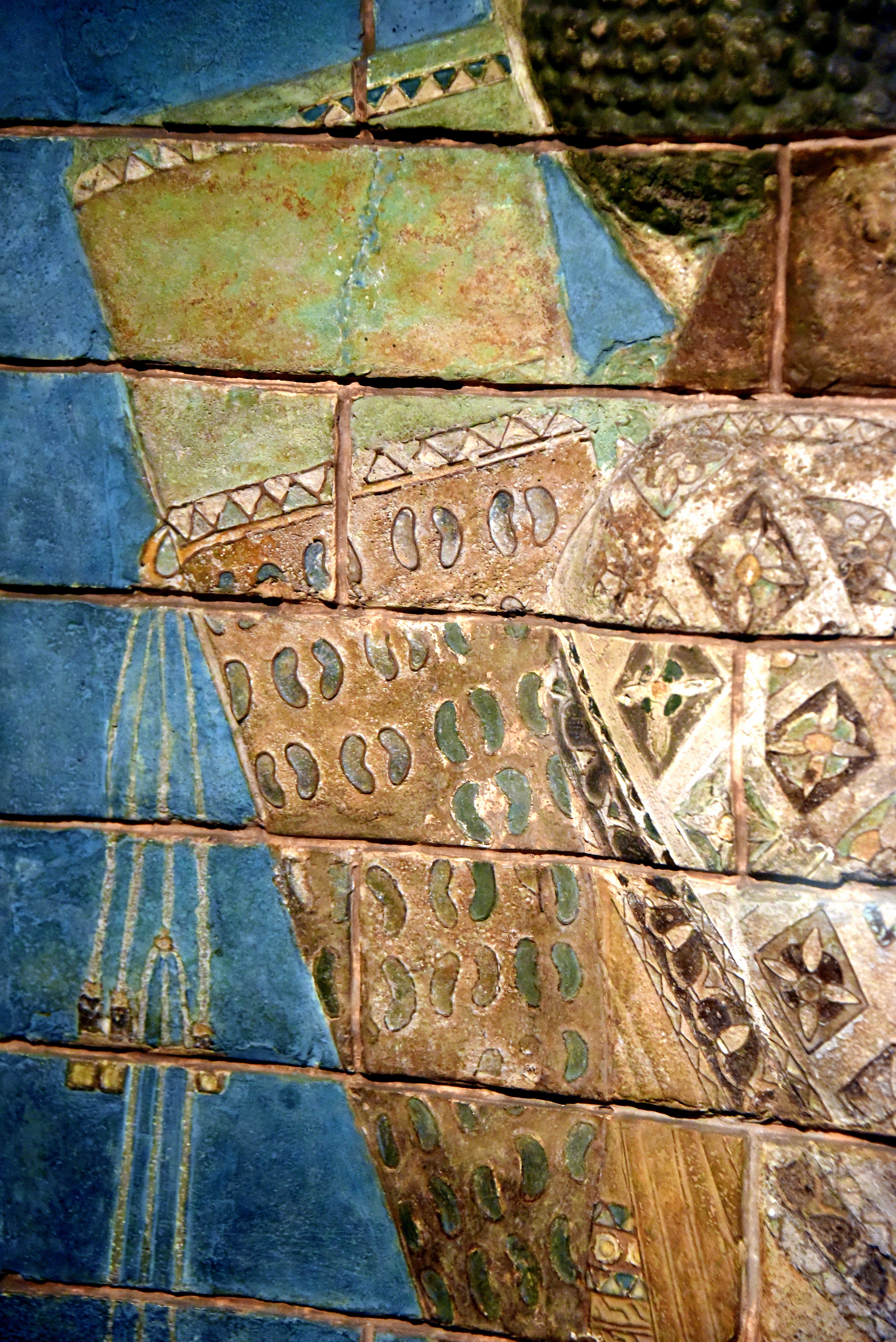
Detail. Royal guard carrying a quiver, member of the so-called Immortals (the 1000 special royal guards). From Susa, Iran. 521-500 BC. British Museum

== See also ==
- Gorytos
