= 1345 in France =

- Decades: 1320s; 1330s; 1340s; 1350s; 1360s
- See also: History of France; Timeline of French history; List of years in France

Events from the year 1345 in France

== Incumbents ==
- Monarch – Philip VI

== Events ==
- January 8 – The marriage of Blanche of France, daughter of King Charles IV of France and his third wife Joan of Évreux, to her second-cousin, Philip, Duke of Orléans, son of King Philip VI of France and Queen Joan the Lame.
- August 8 – Peter, Duke of Bourbon was appointed French commander in Gascony and bases himself at Agen.
- August 9 – Henry of Grosmont, Earl of Derby arrives in Bordeaux with 500 men-at-arms, 500 mounted archers and 1,000 English and Welsh foot archers.
- Late August – The Battle of Bergerac is fought between Anglo-Gascon and French forces at the town of Bergerac, Gascony resulting in an Anglo-Gascon victory. Henry of Grosmont, Earl of Derby, breaking the previous policy of cautious advance in the Hundred Years' War, struck directly at the largest French concentration, at Bergerac, surprising and defeating the French forces under Bertrand I of L'Isle-Jourdain and Henri de Montigny.
- October 21 – The Battle of Auberoche is fought between an Anglo-Gascon force of 1,200 men under Henry of Grosmont, Earl of Derby, and a French army of 7,000 commanded by Louis of Poitiers. It was fought at the village of Auberoche near Périgueux in northern Aquitaine resulting in an Anglo-Gascon victory.

== Births ==
=== Date unknown ===
- Marie of Blois, Duchess of Anjou, Countess of Maine, Duchess of Touraine, titular Queen of Naples and Jerusalem and Countess of Provence

== Deaths ==
- October 21 – Louis I de Poitiers, Count of Valentinois
