= 1339 in France =

- Decades: 1310s; 1320s; 1330s; 1340s; 1350s
- See also: History of France; Timeline of French history; List of years in France

Events from the year 1339 in France.

== Incumbents ==
- Monarch - Philip VI

== Events ==
- Hundred Years' War:
  - February - French forces captured Bordeaux following a siege.
  - 26 September - English King Edward III laid siege to Cambrai as part of his effort to take the throne of France.
  - 8 October - Edward abandoned the siege after learning that French King Philip VI was arriving with an reinforcement army.
  - 24 October - English forces retreated into Duchy of Brabant, ending the Thiérache campaign.
  - October - French naval forces ended their raids along the southern coast of England.
  - 3 December - England formally allied with County of Flanders. In the following months, they launched several small scale attacks on French forces in Picardy.
- 12 May - University of Grenoble was established by Humbert II, Dauphin of the Viennois.
- 22 November - Philip VI convinced Joan of Savoy, Duchess consort of Brittany, to renounce her rights of succession to Count of Savoy in return of an annual payment.

== Births ==
- 23 July - Louis I, Duke of Anjou (died 1384)

=== Full dates unknown ===
- Blanche of Bourbon, Queen consort of Kingdom of Castile and Leon (died 1361)
- John IV, Duke of Brittany (died 1399)
- Philip of Alençon, French cardinal (died 1397)

== Deaths ==
=== Full dates unknown ===
- Marie of Brittany, daughter of John II, Duke of Brittany (born 1268)

== See also ==
Media related to 1339 in France at Wikimedia Commons
