= Frank van Hallen =

Brabant soldier in the service of King Edward III of England

- Seneschal of Gascony
- Arms of Frank van Hallen: Gules, a lion rampant or, crowned azure.
- Died: 1375
- Buried: St. Rumbold's Cathedral, Mechelen, Belgium
- Father: John de Mirabello

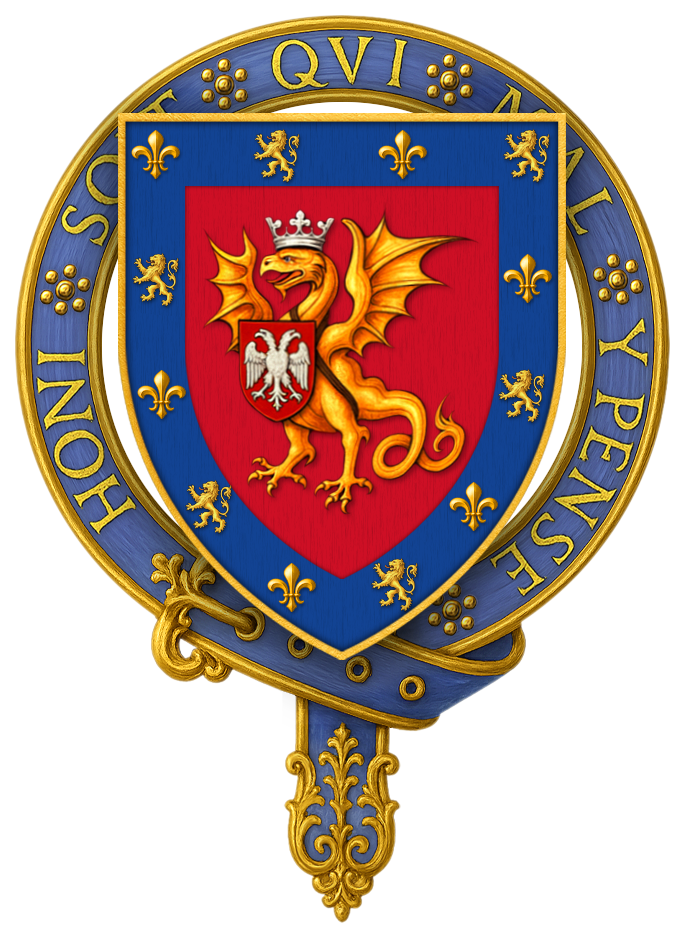
Arms of Sir Franke Van Hallen, KG. as they appear on his garter stall plate in St. George's chapel (known to be incorrect).

Frank van Hallen K.G. (died 1375), Seneschal of Gascony, was a 14th-century Brabant soldier in the service of King Edward III of England. He was also known as Frank de la Halle or Frank de Hale.

== Life ==
Frank was the commander of the garrison of Auberoche Castle in 1345, that was under siege by a French army under the command of Louis of Poitiers. The French siege army was attacked by a relieving Anglo-Gascon army under the command of Henry, Earl of Derby and when Hallen realised that the French troops guarding the castle were distracted or had been drawn off to join the fighting, Hallen sallied with all the mounted men he could muster from the castle. Hallen drove into the rear of the French forces, which were routed and pursued by the English cavalry. Hallen was appointed on 20 June 1349, the Seneschal of Gascony and fought at the battle of Poitiers in 1356. He was appointed a Knight of the Order of the Garter in 1359.

Frank married 3 times and had several sons.
