= Louis I de Poitiers, Count of Valentinois =

14th-century French noble

Arms of the Counts of Valentinois

Louis I de Poitiers (died 21 October 1345), Count of Valentinois, was a 14th-century French noble. Louis was killed during the Battle of Auberoche in 1345.

== Life ==
Louis was a son of Aymar V of Valentinois and Sibylle de Baux. He succeeded his father as Count of Valentinois from 1339.

During the English Gascon campaign of 1345, Poitiers led a French army of 7,000 men besieging the castle of Auberoche, 9 miles (14 km) east of Périgueux. The small Anglo-Gascon garrison was commanded by Frank van Hallen. Henry, Earl of Derby, with an initial relief force of 1,200 English and Gascon soldiers: 400 men-at-arms and 800 mounted archers, arrived to relieve the siege. The French encampment was divided in two, with the majority of the soldiers camped close to the river between the castle and village while a smaller force was situated to prevent any relief attempts from the north.

Derby launched a three-pronged assault on the French encampment, as the French were having their evening meal, and complete surprise was achieved. His longbowmen fired from the treeline to the west into the French position. The French, packed tightly into the narrow meadow, not expecting an attack and unarmoured, are reported to have taken heavy casualties from this. Adam Murimuth, a contemporary chronicler, estimates French casualties at this stage at around 1,000. While the French were confused, and distracted by this attack from the west, Derby made a cavalry charge with his 400 men-at-arms from the south. They had some 200–300 yards (200–300 m) across flat ground to cover to reach the French. French soldiers struggled into their armour and their commanders rallied their still superior forces. A small number of Anglo-Gascon infantry had followed a path in the woods to emerge in the French rear and now attacked from the north west. The fighting continued in the area of the camp for some time. Halle, realising that the French troops guarding his exit from the castle were either distracted or had been drawn off to join the fighting, sallied with all the mounted men he could muster. Taken in the rear, the French defence collapsed and they routed, pursued by the English cavalry.

French casualties were heavy, described by modern historians as "appalling", "extremely high", "staggering", and "heavy". Many French nobles were taken prisoner; lesser men were, as was customary, put to the sword. Louis of Poitiers, died of his wounds. Surviving prisoners included the second in command, Bertrand de l'Isle-Jourdain, two counts, seven viscounts, three barons, the seneschals of Clermont and Toulouse, a nephew of the Pope and so many knights that they were not counted.

== Marriage and issue ==
Louis married Marguerite de Vergy, lady of Vadans the daughter of Henri II de Vergy and Mahaut de St Aubin, they had the following known issue:

- Aymar VI de Poitiers, Count of Valentinois and Diois, lord of Taulignan and Saint-Vallier, married Alix Roger de Beaufort, niece of Pope Clement VI and sister of Pope Gregory XI, they had no issue.
- Marguerite de Poitiers, married Guichard VIII de Beaujeu, had issue.
- Eléonore de Poitiers, married to Pierre de Bar, they had no issue.
