= Siege of Cambrai =

Siege of Cambrai may refer to:

- Siege of Cambrai (1339) during the Hundred Years' War
- Siege of Cambrai (1677) during the Franco-Dutch War
- Storm of Cambrai (1815) during the Waterloo campaign
