= Chevauchée of Edward III =

Chevauchée of Edward III may refer to:

- Chevauchée of Edward III of 1339, in Northern France
- Chevauchée of Edward III in 1346, in Northern France
- A planned chevauchée of Edward III in 1356, from Calais into Northern France, which did not proceed
- Burnt Candlemas, a chevauchée of Edward III through Lothian, Scotland in 1356
- Chevauchée of Edward III in 1359-1360, in Northern France
