= Aymar VI de Poitiers =

Arms of the Counts of Valentinois

Aymar VI de Poitiers, known as "Le Gros", Count of Valentinois and Diois, Lord of Taulignan and Saint-Vallier, Governor of Dauphiné from 1349 to 1355, he was appointed in 1372, Rector of the Comtat Venaissin, by his brother-in-law Pope Gregory XI. He was deputy to Jean de Cheylar, prior of Charraix, near Langeac, in the bishopric of Saint-Flour.

== Biography ==
Poitiers was the eldest son of Louis I de Poitiers, Count of Valentinois, and Marguerite de Vergy. Poitiers married Alix, niece of Clement VI, the daughter of William II Roger de Beaufort and Marie Chambon. He died either in 1374 or 1376 and was buried at the Abbey of Bonlieu, near Marsanne. Aymar appointed his nephew Louis II de Poitiers, as his heir.
