= Battle of Auberoche =

Battle during the Hundred Years' War (1345)

Coordinates: 45°12′32″N 0°53′45″E

- Part of the Gascon campaign of 1345 during the Hundred Years' War
Date	21 October 1345
Location	Auberoche, northern Aquitaine
Result	English victory

Belligerents
Kingdom of England	Kingdom of France

Commanders and leaders
Henry, Earl of Lancaster	Louis of Poitiers †

Strength
1,200	7,000

Casualties and losses
Light	Heavy

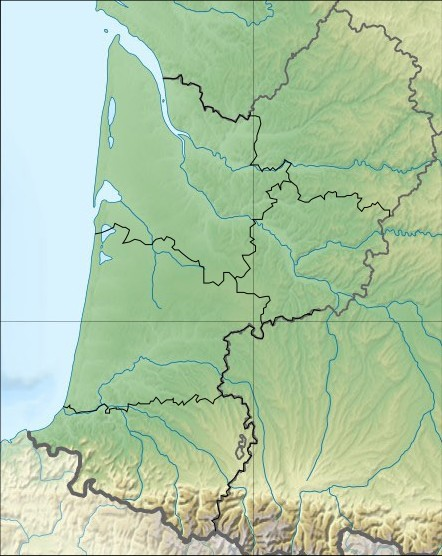
Location of Auberoche in modern Nouvelle-Aquitaine, and other places named in the text

The Battle of Auberoche was fought on 21 October 1345 during the Gascon campaign of 1345 between an Anglo-Gascon force of 1,200 men under Henry, Earl of Derby, and a French army of 7,000 commanded by Louis of Poitiers. It was fought at the village of Auberoche near Périgueux in northern Aquitaine. At the time, Gascony was a territory of the English Crown and the "English" army included a large proportion of native Gascons. The battle resulted in a heavy defeat for the French, who suffered very high casualties, with their leaders killed or captured.

The battle took place during the early stages of the Hundred Years' War. Along with the Battle of Bergerac earlier in the year, it marked a change in the military balance of power in the region as the French position subsequently collapsed. It was one of a series of victories which would lead to Henry of Lancaster being called "one of the best warriors in the world" by a contemporary chronicler.

== Background ==
Since the Norman Conquest of England in 1066, English monarchs had held titles and lands within France, the possession of which made them vassals of the kings of France. Over the centuries, English holdings in France had varied in size, but by 1337 only Gascony in south-western France and Ponthieu in northern France were left. The independent-minded Gascons had their own customs and claimed to have a separate language. A large proportion of the enormous quantity of red wine that they produced was shipped to England in a profitable trade. The Gascons preferred their relationship with a distant English king who left them alone to one with a French king who would interfere in their affairs.

Before the war commenced at least 1,000 ships a year departed Gascony. Among their cargoes were over 80,000 tuns of wine. (Note: The tun was a wine cask used as a standard measure, and contained 252 gallons (954 litres) of wine. 80 thousand tuns of wine equates to 76,320,000 litres (16,790,000 imperial gallons; 20,160,000 US gallons)) The duty levied by the English Crown on wine from Bordeaux, the capital of Gascony, was more than all other English customs duties combined and by far the largest source of state income. Bordeaux had a population of over 50,000, greater than London's, and Bordeaux was possibly richer. However, by this time English Gascony had become so truncated by French encroachments that it relied on imports of food, largely from England. Any interruptions to regular shipping were liable to starve Gascony and financially cripple England; the French were well aware of this.

The status of the English kings' French fiefs was a major source of conflict between the two monarchies throughout the Middle Ages. French monarchs systematically sought to check the growth of English power, stripping away lands as the opportunity arose. Towards the end of 1336, following a series of disagreements between Philip VI of France (r. 1328–1350) and Edward III of England (r. 1327–1377), Philip decided that war was the only way to drive the English out for good. On 24 May 1337, Philip's Great Council in Paris agreed that the Duchy of Aquitaine, effectively Gascony, should be taken back into Philip's hands on the grounds that Edward was in breach of his obligations as a vassal. This marked the start of the Hundred Years' War, which was to last 116 years.

Although Gascony was the cause of the war, Edward was able to spare few resources for its defence, and previously when an English army had campaigned on the continent it had operated in northern France. In most campaigning seasons the Gascons had to rely on their own resources and had been hard pressed by the French. In 1339 the French besieged Bordeaux, the capital of Gascony, even breaking into the city with a large force before they were repulsed. Typically the Gascons could field 3,000–6,000 men, the large majority infantry, although up to two-thirds of them would be tied down in garrisons.

There was no formal border between English and French territory. Many landholders owned a patchwork of widely separated estates, perhaps owing fealty to a different overlord for each, or holding some rights from the French Crown as the monarch and others from the English Crown as their liege lord. Each small estate was likely to have a fortified tower or keep, with larger estates having castles. Fortifications were also constructed at transport choke points, to collect tolls and to restrict military passage; fortified towns grew up alongside all bridges and most fords over the many rivers in the region.

Military forces could support themselves by foraging so long as they moved on at frequent intervals. If they wished to remain in one place for any length of time, as was necessary to besiege a castle, then access to water transport was essential for supplies of food and fodder, and desirable for such items as siege equipment. Warfare was usually a struggle for possession of castles and other fortified points, and for the mutable loyalty of the local nobility; the region had been in a state of flux for centuries and many local lords served whichever monarch was considered the stronger, regardless of national ties.

By 1345, after eight years of war, English-controlled territory mostly consisted of a coastal strip from Bordeaux to Bayonne, with isolated strongholds further inland. The French had strong fortifications throughout what had once been English-controlled Gascony. Several directly threatened Bordeaux: Libourne, 20 miles (32 km) to the east, allowed French armies to assemble a day's march from Bordeaux; the strongly fortified town of Blaye was situated on the north bank of the Gironde only 25 miles (40 km) downstream of Bordeaux and in a position to interdict its vital seaborne communications; the fortress of Langon, 30 miles (48 km) south of Bordeaux, blocked upstream communication along the Garonne, and facilitated the supply of any French force advancing on Bordeaux.

== Plans ==
Edward determined early in 1345 to attack France on three fronts. The Earl of Northampton would lead a small force to Brittany, a slightly larger force would proceed to Gascony under the command of Henry, Earl of Derby, and the main force would accompany Edward to northern France or Flanders. The previous Seneschal of Gascony, Nicholas de la Beche, was replaced by the more senior Ralph, Earl of Stafford, who sailed for Gascony in February with an advance force. Derby was appointed the King's Lieutenant in Gascony on 13 March 1345 and received a contract to raise a force of 2,000 men in England, and further troops in Gascony itself. The highly detailed contract of indenture had a term of six months from the opening of the campaign in Gascony, with an option for Edward III to extend it for a further six months on the same terms. Derby was given a high degree of autonomy; for example, his strategic instructions were: si guerre soit, et a faire le bien q'il poet ("if there is war, do the best you can").

In early 1345 the French decided to stand on the defensive in the south west. Their intelligence correctly predicted English offensives in the three theatres, but they did not have the money to raise a significant army in each. They anticipated, correctly, that the English planned to make their main effort in northern France. Thus they directed what resources they had there, planning to assemble their main army at Arras on 22 July. South-western France was encouraged to rely on its own resources, but as the Truce of Malestroit, signed in early 1343, was still in effect, the local lords were reluctant to spend money, and little was done.

== Prelude ==
France in 1328 Under French royal control in 1214 Gained from English control by 1328 England and English-controlled in 1328

Derby's force embarked at Southampton at the end of May. Due to bad weather, his fleet of 151 ships was forced to shelter in Falmouth for several weeks en route, finally departing on 23 July. The Gascons, primed by Stafford to expect Derby's arrival in late May and sensing the French weakness, took the field without him. The Gascons captured the large, weakly garrisoned castles of Montravel and Monbreton on the Dordogne in early June; both were taken by surprise and their seizure broke the tenuous Truce of Malestroit. Stafford made a short advance north to besiege Blaye with his advance party and perhaps 1,000 men-at-arms and 3,000 infantry of the Gascon lords. Having established the siege he left the Gascons to prosecute it and proceeded to Langon, south of Bordeaux, and set up a second siege. The Anglo-Gascon forces at both sieges could be readily supplied by ship. The French issued an urgent call to arms.

Meanwhile, small independent parties of Gascons raided across the region. Local French groups joined them, and several minor nobles threw in their lot with the Anglo-Gascons. They had several significant successes, but their main effect was to tie down most of the weak French garrisons in the region and to cause them to call for reinforcements. The few mobile French troops in the region immobilised themselves with sieges: of Casseneuil in the Agenais; Monchamp near Condom; and Montcuq, a strong but strategically insignificant castle south of Bergerac. Large areas were effectively undefended.

Edward III's main army sailed on 29 June. They anchored off Sluys (Sluis) in Flanders until 22 July, while Edward attended to diplomatic affairs. When they sailed, probably intending to land in Normandy, they were scattered by a storm and found their way to various English ports over the following week. After more than five weeks on board ship, the men and horses had to be disembarked. There was a further week's delay while the King and his council debated what to do, by which time it proved impossible to take any action with the main English army before winter. Aware of this, Philip VI despatched reinforcements to Brittany and Gascony. Peter, Duke of Bourbon was appointed French commander in Gascony on 8 August and based himself at Agen.

== Bergerac ==
August–November 1345 troop movements Derby's advance Derby's retreat Louis of Poitiers' advance Derby's advance to Auberoche Derby's return to La Réole

On 9 August 1345, Derby arrived in Bordeaux with 500 men-at-arms, 500 mounted archers and 1,000 English and Welsh foot archers. After two weeks recruiting and organising, Derby marched his force to Langon, rendezvoused with Stafford and took command of the combined force. Stafford had to this point pursued a cautious strategy of small-scale sieges. Derby's intention was quite different; rather than continue a cautious war of sieges he was determined to strike directly at the French main force before it was fully assembled.

The French, hearing of Derby's arrival, concentrated their forces at the strategically important town of Bergerac, where there was an important bridge over the Dordogne River. After a council of war, Derby decided to strike at the French there. The capture of the town, which had good river supply links to Bordeaux, would provide the Anglo-Gascon army with a base from which to carry the war to the French. It would also force the lifting of the siege of the nearby allied castle of Montcuq and sever communications between French forces north and south of the Dordogne. The English believed that if the French field army could be beaten or distracted the town could be easily taken.

Derby moved rapidly and took the French army by surprise, defeating them in a running battle. French casualties were heavy, with many killed and a large number captured, including their commander. The surviving French from their field army rallied around John, Count of Armagnac, and retreated north to Périgueux. Within days of the battle, Bergerac fell to an Anglo-Gascon assault and was subsequently sacked. After consolidating and reorganising for two weeks Derby left a large garrison in the town and moved north to the Anglo-Gascon stronghold of Mussidan in the Isle valley with 6,000–8,000 men. He then pushed west to Périgueux, the provincial capital, taking several strongpoints on the way.

The city's defences were antiquated and derelict, but the size of the French force defending it prohibited an assault. Derby blockaded Périgueux and captured strongholds blocking the main routes into the city. John, Duke of Normandy, the son and heir of Philip VI, gathered an army reportedly numbering over 20,000 and manoeuvred in the area. In early October a very large detachment relieved the city and drove off Derby's force, which withdrew towards Bordeaux. Further reinforced, the French started besieging the English-held strongpoints.

== Siege ==
The main French force of 7,000, commanded by Louis of Poitiers, besieged the castle of Auberoche, nine miles (14 km) east of Périgueux. Auberoche perches on a rocky promontory completely commanding the River Auvézère and the valley road at a point where the valley narrows almost to a gorge. The small Anglo-Gascon garrison was commanded by Frank van Hallen. The French encampment was divided in two, with the majority of the soldiers camped close to the river between the castle and village, while a smaller force was situated to prevent any relief attempts from the north.

The chronicler Froissart tells a tale, most likely apocryphal, that a soldier attempting to reach English lines with a letter requesting help was captured and returned to the castle via a trebuchet. A messenger did get through French lines and reached Derby, who was already returning to the area with a scratch force of 1,200 English and Gascon soldiers: 400 men-at-arms and 800 mounted archers.

== Battle ==
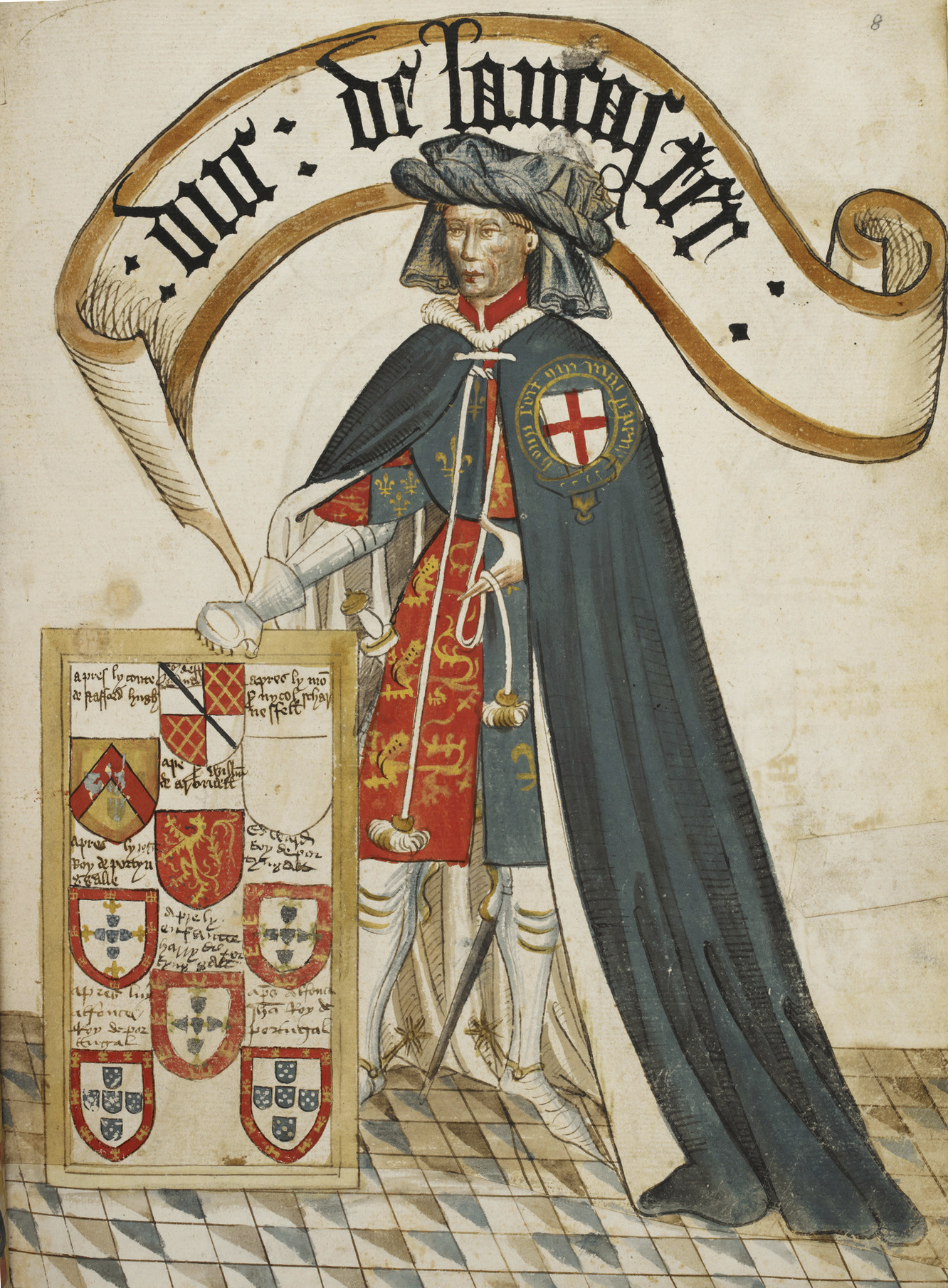
Henry of Grosmont, 1st Duke of Lancaster, Earl of Derby

Knowing he was outnumbered, Derby waited near Périgueux for several days for the arrival of a force under the Earl of Pembroke. Unknown to Derby, another French army of some 9,000 to 10,000 men under the Duke of Normandy was only 25 miles (40 km) away. On the evening of 20 October Derby decided that waiting any longer would invite an attack from the larger French army and made a night march, crossing the shallow river twice, so that by morning he was situated on a low wooded hill about a mile (1.6 km) from the main French camp in the valley by the river. Derby personally reconnoitred the French position. Still hoping for the last-minute arrival of Pembroke, Derby called a council of his officers. It was decided that rather than wait and possibly lose the advantage of surprise, the army would attack immediately and attempt to overrun the French camp before an effective defence could be devised.

Derby planned a three-pronged assault. The attack was launched as the French were having their evening meal, and complete surprise was achieved. His longbowmen shot from the treeline to the west into the French position. The French, packed tightly into the narrow meadow, not expecting an attack and unarmoured, are reported to have taken heavy casualties from this. Adam Murimuth, a contemporary chronicler, estimates French casualties at this stage at around 1,000.

While the French were confused and distracted by this attack from the west, Derby made a cavalry charge with his 400 men-at-arms from the south. They had some 200 to 300 yards (200 to 300 m) across flat ground to cover to reach the French. French soldiers struggled into their armour and their commanders rallied their still superior forces. A small number of Anglo-Gascon infantry had followed a path in the woods to emerge in the French rear and attacked from the north-west. The fighting continued in the area of the camp for some time.

Hallen realised that the French troops guarding his exit from the castle were either distracted or had been drawn off to join the fighting; he sallied with all the mounted men he could muster and took the French in the rear. At this further unexpected attack the French defence collapsed and they routed, pursued by the English cavalry. Those French still holding their position in the small camp to the north fled without fighting.

French casualties are uncertain, but were heavy. Murimuth states that French fatalities caused by the archers alone were 700 men-at-arms and over 1,000 infantry. Total casualties are variously described by modern historians as "appalling", "extremely high", "staggering", and "heavy". Many French nobles were taken prisoner; lesser men were, as was customary, put to the sword. The French commander, Louis of Poitiers, died of his wounds. Surviving prisoners included the second-in-command, Bertrand de l'Isle-Jourdain, two counts, seven viscounts, three barons, the seneschals of Clermont and Toulouse, a nephew of the Pope and so many knights that they were not counted.

== Aftermath ==
The French left behind them a large quantity of loot and supplies. This was in addition to the ransoms extracted from the French captives for their release, which was due to the individuals who had captured them, shared with their liege lords. The ransoms alone made a fortune for many of the soldiers in Derby's army, as well as Derby himself, who was said to have made at least £50,000 (£60,000,000 as of 2025 (Note: UK Consumer Price Index inflation figures from 1209–2024 based on data from "Inflation calculator". Bank of England. London. 18 February 2026.)) from the day's captives, approximately equal to Edward III's annual income. Over the following year Philip VI paid large amounts from the royal treasury as contributions towards the captives' ransoms.

The Duke of Normandy lost heart on hearing of the defeat. Despite outnumbering the Anglo-Gascon force eight to one he retreated to Angoulême and disbanded his army. The French also abandoned all of their ongoing sieges of other Anglo-Gascon garrisons. Derby was left almost completely unopposed for six months, during which he seized more towns, including Montségur, La Réole and Aiguillon and greatly increased English territory and influence in south-west France.

Local morale, and more importantly prestige in the border region, had decidedly swung England's way following this conflict, providing an influx of taxes and recruits for the English armies. Local lords of note declared for the English, bringing significant retinues with them. The four-month campaign has been described as "the first successful land campaign of... the Hundred Years' War", which had commenced more than eight years earlier. With this success, the English had established a regional dominance which would last over thirty years.

Modern historians have praised the generalship demonstrated by Derby in this campaign: "superb and innovative tactician"; "ris[ing] to the level of genius"; "brilliant in the extreme"; "stunning"; "brilliant". The Chronique des quatre premiers Valois, written fifty years after the event, describes him as "one of the best warriors in the world". Derby went on to lead another successful campaign in 1346.

== Notes, citations and sources ==
=== General sources ===
- Burne, Alfred (Summer 1949). "Auberoche, 1345: A Forgotten Battle". Journal of the Society for Army Historical Research. 27 (110): 62–67. ISSN 0037-9700. JSTOR 44232166.
- Burne, Alfred (1999) [1954]. The Crecy War. Ware, Hertfordshire: Wordsworth Editions. ISBN 978-1840222104.
- Crowcroft, Robert & Cannon, John (2015). "Gascony". The Oxford Companion to British History. Oxford: Oxford University Press. p. 389. ISBN 978-0199677832.
- Curry, Anne (2002). The Hundred Years' War 1337–1453 (PDF). Oxford: Osprey Publishing. ISBN 978-1-84176-269-2. Archived from the original (PDF) on 27 September 2018.
- DeVries, Kelly (2006). Infantry Warfare in the Early Fourteenth Century: Discipline, Tactics, and Technology. Woodbridge, Suffolk: Boydell & Brewer. ISBN 978-0851155715.
- Fowler, Kenneth (1961). Henry of Grosmont, First Duke of Lancaster, 1310–1361 (PDF) (PhD thesis). Leeds: University of Leeds.
- Gribit, Nicholas (2016). Henry of Lancaster's Expedition to Aquitaine 1345–46. Woodbridge, Suffolk: Boydell & Brewer. ISBN 978-1783271177.
- Harris, Robin (1994). Valois Guyenne. Royal Historical Society Studies in History. Vol. 71. Woodbridge, Suffolk: Boydell & Brewer. ISBN 978-0861932269.
- King, Andy (2002). "According to the Custom Used in French and Scottish Wars: Prisoners and Casualties on the Scottish Marches in the Fourteenth Century". Journal of Medieval History. 28 (3): 263–290. doi:10.1016/S0048-721X(02)00057-X. ISSN 0304-4181. S2CID 159873083.
- Lucas, Henry S. (1929). The Low Countries and the Hundred Years' War: 1326–1347. Ann Arbor: University of Michigan Press. OCLC 960872598.
- Oman, Charles (1998) [1924]. A History of the Art of War in the Middle Ages: 1278–1485 A.D. London: Greenhill Books. ISBN 978-1853673320.
- Prestwich, Michael (2007). J. M. Roberts (ed.). Plantagenet England 1225–1360. New Oxford History of England. Oxford: Oxford University Press. ISBN 978-0199226870.
- Rodger, N. A. M. (2004). The Safeguard of the Sea. London: Penguin. ISBN 978-0140297249.
- Rogers, Clifford J. (1998). "The Efficacy of the Medieval Longbow: A Reply to Kelly DeVries" (PDF). War in History. 5 (2): 233–242. doi:10.1177/096834459800500205. ISSN 0968-3445. S2CID 161286935. Archived from the original (PDF) on 3 February 2019.
- Rogers, Clifford J. (2004). Bachrach, Bernard S.; DeVries, Kelly & Rogers, Clifford J (eds.). "The Bergerac Campaign (1345) and the Generalship of Henry of Lancaster". Journal of Medieval Military History. II. Woodbridge, Suffolk: Boydell & Brewer. ISBN 978-1843830405. ISSN 0961-7582.
- Sumption, Jonathan (1990). Trial by Battle. London: Faber and Faber. ISBN 978-0571200955.
- Vale, Malcolm (1999). "The War in Aquitaine". In Curry, Anne & Hughes, Michael (eds.). Arms, Armies and Fortifications in the Hundred Years War. Woodbridge, Suffolk: Boydell & Brewer. pp. 69–82. ISBN 978-0851157559.
- Wagner, John A. (2006). "Auberoche, Battle of (1345)". Encyclopedia of the Hundred Years War. Woodbridge, Suffolk: Greenwood. pp. 35–36. ISBN 978-0313327360.
