= Henry of Grosmont, Duke of Lancaster =

English soldier and diplomat (c. 1310–1361)

Henry of Grosmont KG
- Duke of Lancaster; Earl of Lancaster and Leicester
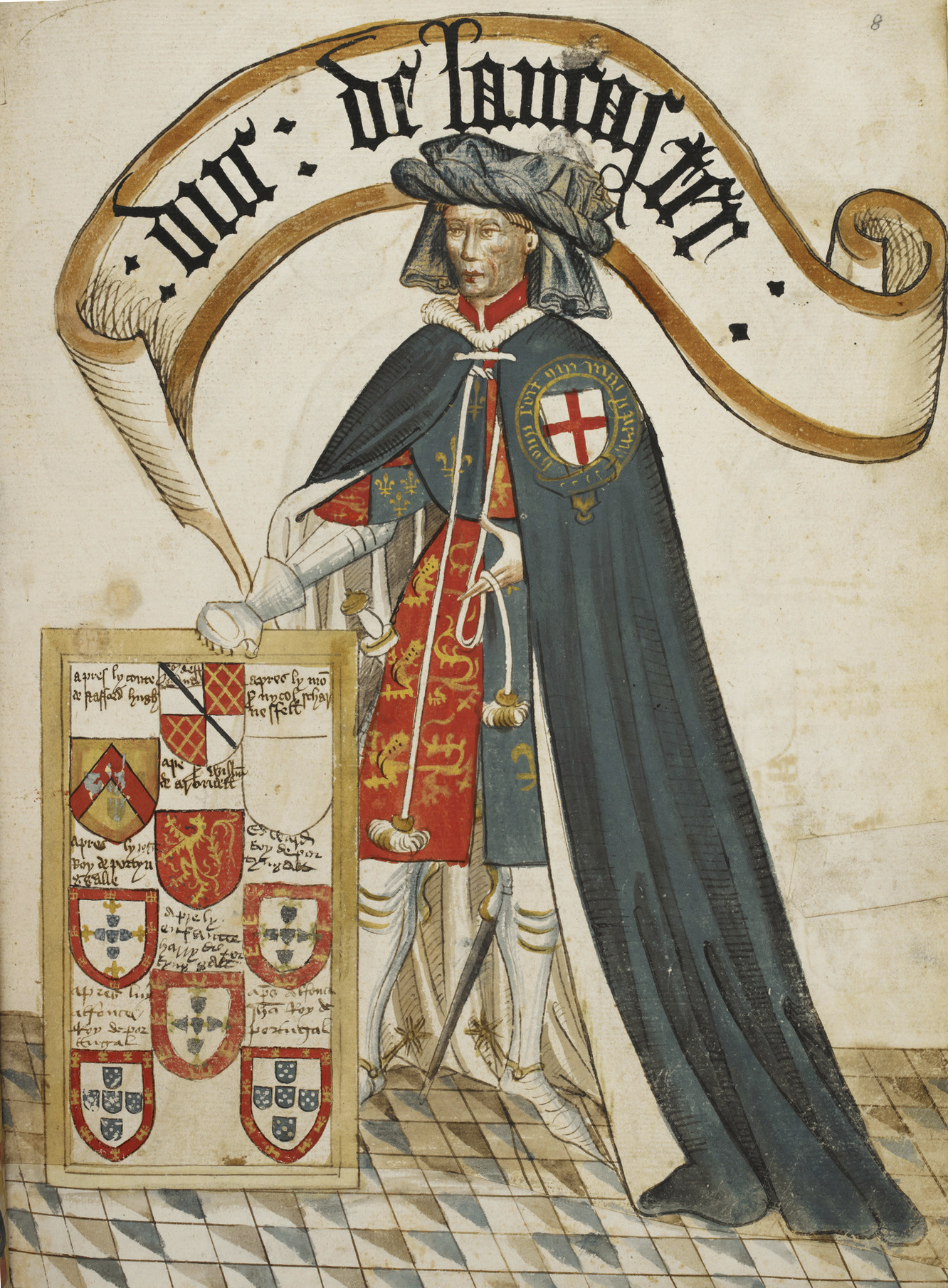
- Duc de Lancaster, from the Bruges Garter Book (1430) by William Bruges
- Born: c. 1310; Grosmont Castle, Grosmont, Monmouthshire, Wales
- Died: 23 March 1361 (aged 50–51); Leicester Castle, Leicester, Leicestershire, England
- Buried: 14 April 1361; Church of the Annunciation of Our Lady of the Newarke
- Wars and battles: Second War of Scottish Independence; Siege of Berwick; Battle of Halidon Hill; Hundred Years' War; Thiérache campaign; Siege of Cambrai; Battle of Sluys; Battle of Bergerac; Battle of Auberoche; Siege of Aiguillon; Chevauchée of 1346; Siege of Calais; Battle of Winchelsea; Northern Crusades
- Noble family: Lancaster
- Spouse: Isabel of Beaumont
- Issue: Maud, Duchess of Bavaria; Blanche, Duchess of Lancaster
- Father: Henry, 3rd Earl of Lancaster
- Mother: Maud Chaworth

Henry of Grosmont, Duke of Lancaster KG (c. 1310 – 23 March 1361) was an English statesman, diplomat, soldier, and Christian writer. The owner of Bolingbroke Castle in Lincolnshire, Grosmont was a member of the House of Plantagenet, which was ruling over England at that time. He was the wealthiest and most powerful peer of the realm.

The son and heir of Henry, 3rd Earl of Lancaster, and Maud Chaworth, Grosmont became one of King Edward III's most trusted captains in the early phases of the Hundred Years' War and distinguished himself with victory in the Battle of Auberoche. He was a founding member and the second knight of the Order of the Garter in 1348, and in 1351 was created Duke of Lancaster. An intelligent and reflective man, Grosmont taught himself to write and was the author of the book Livre de Seyntz Medicines, a highly personal devotional treatise. He is remembered as one of the founders and early patrons of Corpus Christi College, Cambridge, which was established by two guilds of the town in 1352.

== Origins ==
Henry of Grosmont (Note: In his early years Henry was known, as was customary at the time, after his birthplace, Grosmont.) was the only son of Henry, 3rd Earl of Lancaster (c. 1281–1345), who in turn was the younger brother and heir of Thomas, 2nd Earl of Lancaster (c. 1278–1322). They were sons of Edmund Crouchback, 1st Earl of Lancaster (1245–1296), the second son of King Henry III (ruled 1216–1272) and younger brother of King Edward I of England (ruled 1272–1307). Henry of Grosmont was thus a first cousin once removed of King Edward II and a second cousin of King Edward III (ruled 1327–1377). His mother was Maud de Chaworth (1282–1322). On his paternal grandmother's side, Henry of Grosmont was also the great-great-grandson of Louis VIII of France.

Little is known of Grosmont's childhood and youth. Due to his uncle Thomas' increasingly hostile relations with King Edward II—culminating in his rebellion and execution in 1322—historian Kenneth Fowler suggests that this period "must have been quite eventful", and that Grosmount's "fortunes and opportunities were inextricably bound up with the tragic events of these years". The year and place of his birth are not known with certainty. He is believed to have been born c. 1310 at Grosmont Castle in Grosmont, Monmouthshire, Wales. According to his own memoirs he was a "good looking, youth. Tall fair and slim", and better at martial arts than at academic subjects; he did not learn to read until later in life. His education would have been orthodox, but in being so, produced the archetypal young noble admired at the time.

Henry of Grosmont was the eventual heir of his wealthy uncle Thomas, 2nd Earl of Lancaster, who through his marriage to Alice de Lacy, daughter and heiress of Henry de Lacy, 3rd Earl of Lincoln, had become the wealthiest peer in England. Constant quarrels between Thomas and his first cousin, King Edward II of England, led to his execution in 1322. Having no progeny, Thomas's possessions and titles went to his younger brother Henry, 3rd Earl of Lancaster, Grosmont's father. Henry of Lancaster assented to the deposition of Edward II in 1327, but fell out of favour with the regency of his widow Queen Isabella and Roger Mortimer. When Edward III, the son of Edward II, took personal control of the government in 1330, relations with the Crown improved, but by this time Henry of Lancaster was struggling with blindness and poor health. He was able to attend the new king's coronation on 1 February 1327, where he knighted Edward. Grosmont was knighted the same year, represented his father in Parliament and attended the King's council. He is known to have travelled a great deal between his father's estates, presumably supervising their management. In 1331 he participated in a royal tournament at Cheapside in the City of London. (Note: On which occasion the stand collapsed and Queen Isabelle was nearly injured.) It was, argues Fowler, conducive to Lancastrian relations with the crown that the new King and Grosmont were of a similar age and interests, and Grosmont was never to experience the reversals of fortune his father had faced.

== Estates and finances ==
Originally heir to only the lordships of Beaufort and Monmouth, by 1327 it was looking probable that he would inherit most of the Lancastrian patrimony. He was not yet independent from his father, from whom he received regular funds – amounting to £666 in 1332 – as well as grants from the English crown as a reward for his service and in recognition of his lack of a personal income. From early the next year, his father began transferring his South Wales estates into Grosmont's name, giving him an independent income. In March 1337 he was one of six men Edward III promoted to higher levels of the peerage; one of his father's lesser titles, the Earldom of Derby, was bestowed upon him. He was also granted a royal annuity of 1,000 marks (Note: A medieval English mark was an accounting unit equivalent to two-thirds of a pound sterling.) (£1,150,000 as of 2025 (Note: UK Retail Price Index inflation figures are based on data from Clark, Gregory (2017). "The Annual RPI and Average Earnings for Britain, 1209 to Present (New Series)". MeasuringWorth. To give a very rough idea of earning power, an English foot-soldier could expect to earn £1 in wages in approximately 3 months for, usually seasonal, military service.)) for so long as his father lived, and a number of lucrative estates and perquisites were settled on him. By this point Grosmont's future relationship with the crown was "actively assured" comments Fowler.

The early 1340s were a period of financial constraint for Grosmont due to his acting as a broker for a number of loans between the King and Flemish bankers. As well as undergoing a number of periods of imprisonment as a debtor, Grosmont was eventually to raise numerous large sums, including £969 to gain the release of the royal crown, which Edward had pawned, and £1,500 worth of jewels to free the King after he had offered himself as security for loans.

== Scotland ==
In 1328 Edward III's regents had agreed to the Treaty of Northampton with Robert Bruce, King of Scotland (r. 1306–1329), but this was widely resented in England and commonly known as turpis pax, "the cowards' peace". Some Scots nobles refused to swear fealty to Bruce and were disinherited. They left Scotland to join forces with Edward Balliol, son of King John Balliol (r. 1292–1296), whom Edward I had deposed in 1296. One of these was Grosmont's father-in-law, Henry de Beaumont, Earl of Buchan and veteran campaigner of the First War of Scottish Independence. Robert Bruce died in 1329; his heir was 5-year-old David II (r. 1329–1371). In 1330 Edward III, who had recently assumed his full powers, made a formal request to the Scottish Crown to restore Beaumont's lands which was refused. In 1331 the disinherited Scottish nobles gathered in Yorkshire, and led by Balliol and Beaumont plotted an invasion of Scotland. Edward III was aware of the scheme but turned a blind eye. Balliol's forces sailed for Scotland on 31 July 1332. Five days after landing in Fife, Balliol's force of some 2,000 men met the Scottish army of 12,000–15,000 men and crushed them at the Battle of Dupplin Moor. Balliol was crowned king of Scotland at Scone on 24 September 1332. Balliol's support within Scotland was limited and within six months it had collapsed. He was ambushed by supporters of David II at the Battle of Annan a few months after his coronation and fled to England half-dressed and riding bareback. He appealed to Edward III for assistance.

On 10 March Balliol, the disinherited Scottish lords and some English magnates crossed the border and laid siege to the Scottish town of Berwick-upon-Tweed. Six weeks later a large English army under Edward III joined them, bringing the total number of besiegers to nearly 10,000. Grosmont was present at the Siege of Berwick (1333), but it is not known if he marched with his father-in-law and Balliol, or with the main English effort. The Scots felt compelled to attempt to relieve the siege and an army of 20,000 men attacked the English at the Battle of Halidon Hill, 2 miles (3.2 km) from Berwick. Under intense bow-fire the Scottish army broke, the camp followers made off with the horses and the fugitives were pursued by the mounted English knights. Scottish casualties were numbered in thousands, including their commander and five earls dead on the field. Scots who surrendered were killed on Edward's orders and some drowned as they fled into the sea. English casualties were reported as fourteen; some chronicles give a lower figure of seven. About a hundred Scots who had been taken prisoner were beheaded the next morning, 20 July. It is presumed that Grosmont took part in the battle, but it is possible that he was part of the detachment posted to ensure that the garrison of Berwick did not sally. Berwick surrendered the day after the battle and Grosmont witnessed and sealed the articles of surrender and, a little later, the town's new charter.

Balliol having sworn fealty to David II, and because he intended to make Scotland subservient to the English, most Scots refused to accept Balliol as their monarch. In December 1334 Grosmont accompanied Edward III to Roxburgh in Scotland. The English force of 4,000 accomplished little and withdrew in February. Grosmont was a member of Edward III's negotiation team when a brief truce was agreed shortly after at Nottingham. In July Grosmont accompanied Edward III on another invasion of Scotland, with an army of 13,000 – for the time an extremely large force. Scotland was quelled as far north as Perth and Grosmont took a senior role in raiding deeper into the country. In 1336 Grosmont was given command of 500 men-at-arms and 1,000 longbowmen and marched to Perth. Informed that the widow of the Earl of Atholl was besieged in Lochindorb Castle, Grosmont led a small force to rescue her and raise the siege, which he had achieved by 16 July. He was given full plenipotentiary powers by the King. After Edward III reached Perth with the main English army, Grosmont was despatched on a long-range raid to Aberdeen, 80 miles (100 km) away. He returned after two weeks, having razed Aberdeen and devastated the country on the way. Edward went south for six weeks, leaving Grosmont in charge of English-occupied Scotland. Believing that he would soon be at war with France, Edward withdrew most of his forces from Scotland in mid-1336 and sent Grosmont to London to plan the defence of the English Channel ports from the mouth of the Thames westward. By May the following year he was once again in Scotland—accompanied by the Earls of Warwick and of Arundel—and by the time he returned to London, war with France had commenced. (Note: Since the Norman Conquest of 1066, English monarchs had held titles and lands within France, the possession of which made them vassals of the kings of France. By 1337 only Gascony in southwestern France and Ponthieu in northern France were left. Following a series of disagreements between Philip VI of France (r. 1328–1350) and Edward III of England (r. 1327–1377), including over who was the rightful king of Scotland, on 24 May 1337 Philip's Great Council agreed Gascony should be taken back into Philip's hands, on the grounds that Edward was in breach of his obligations as a vassal. In retaliation, Edward ordered the confiscation of all French property in England. These events marked the start of the Hundred Years' War, which was to last until 1453.) Fowler suggests that "while in all these military enterprises Henry seldom played a leading role, they formed an invaluable apprenticeship for the years ahead".

== Northeast France ==
Grosmont's first trip abroad was probably to Brabant in 1332. Six years later he travelled with Edward III to Flanders, which began inauspiciously when the King was "unable to pay or induce" his erstwhile allies to attack the French. Grosmont attended Edward's ostentatious meeting with the Holy Roman Emperor, Louis IV, at Coblenz. This was a diplomatic mission amidst much pageantry; Edward III concluded agreements with a number of rulers, including Louis, whereby they would provide troops in exchange for payment. Edward was appointed Imperial vicar. To cement the Flemish alliance, and on account of Edward's shortage of money, Grosmont and the Earl of Salisbury were imprisoned as sureties for Edward providing the balance of payment due his allies. (Note: May McKisack argues that it was Edward's creation of six comital titles at the same time, and his obligation to provide for them according to their new status, that accounted predominantly for the paucity of royal finances.) Throughout the year French naval forces ravaged the English south coast. Edward III planned to invade France with his army of allies in 1339, but was finding it impossible to raise the money to pay them; he and his ambassadors had committed him to far greater expense than he could fund. Grosmont led part of Edward III's army when it finally invaded France in September 1339. Cambrai was besieged, the area around it devastated, and an unsuccessful attempt made to storm the town. The allied army pressed further into France, but the French refused to battle. In mid-October, the French issued a formal challenge to battle. Edward accepted and occupied a strong defensive position at La Capelle which the French declined to attack; Grosmont commanded a detachment. Having run out of provisions, money and weather suitable for campaigning, the allied army withdrew and dispersed. Grosmont arrived in Brussels with the army at the end of October, where the campaign was celebrated with a tournament.

From 29 March to 3 April 1340 Grosmont attended Parliament in London, where a substantial subsidy was voted to the crown. Meanwhile, encouraged by Edward III, the Flemings, vassals of Philip VI, revolted during the winter. They joined forces with Edward's continental allies and launched an April offensive, which failed. A French offensive against these forces commenced on 18 May, meeting with mixed fortunes; Edward's outnumbered allies were desperate for the English army to reinforce them.

Grosmont was present at the great English victory in the naval Battle of Sluys in June 1340. The outnumbered English fleet attacked the French and captured or sank 190 of their 213 ships. French losses were between 16,000 and 20,000 killed. The joint French commanders were both captured and one was hanged from the mast of his own ship, while the other was beheaded. Soon after Grosmont was required to commit himself as a hostage in the Low Countries to merchants who had covered the debts – amounting to £9,450 – the King had incurred. Since Grosmont had personally bound himself to a number of Edward's creditors, he was imprisoned as a debtor. He remained hostage until the next year and had to pay a large ransom for his release. He was only able to join the English army when it laid siege to Tournai as a result of promising that if he did not pay in full he would return voluntarily for a period of further imprisonment. In September Grosmont was part of the embassy which signed the Truce of Espléchin, a five-year suspension of the fighting. Edward was unable to raise the necessary funds to repay his loans and on 25 September Grosmont returned to Malines to, as the King wrote in October, "lay in prison" again. Grosmont was not treated poorly, although the King probably exaggerated his situation for domestic consumption. Grosmont was allowed out on parole to attend jousts several times and received five marks a day expenses. He eventually raised three loans between May and August 1341 to release his bond. Numerous other costs and charges were still due, negotiations over which dragged on until the next year when the King took over the debts.

On his return, he was made the king's lieutenant in the north, or Scotland, and stayed at Roxburgh until 1342 when a six-month truce allowed a number of jousts and tournaments to take place. The next years he spent in diplomatic negotiations in the Low Countries, Castile and Avignon.

== Southwest France ==
=== 1345 ===
August–November 1345 troop movements Derby's advance Derby's retreat Louis of Poitiers' advance Derby's advance to Auberoche Derby's return to La Réole

Edward III decided early in 1345 to attack France on three fronts. The Earl of Northampton would lead a small force to Brittany, a slightly larger force would proceed to Gascony under the command of Grosmont, and the main English army would accompany Edward to either northern France or Flanders. Grosmont was appointed the King's Lieutenant in Gascony on 13 March 1345 and received a contract to raise a force of 2,000 men in England, and further troops in Gascony. The highly detailed contract of indenture had a term of six months from the opening of the campaign in Gascony, with an option for Edward to extend it for a further six months on the same terms. Derby (Grosmont) was given a high degree of autonomy, for example, his strategic instructions were: "si guerre soit, et a faire le bien q'il poet" (... if there is war, do the best you can ...).

On 9 August 1345 Grosmont arrived in Bordeaux with 500 men-at-arms, 1,500 English and Welsh archers – 500 of the latter mounted on ponies to increase their mobility – ancillary and support troops. Rather than continue the cautious war of sieges he was determined to strike directly at the French before they could concentrate their forces. He decided to move on Bergerac, which had good river supply links to Bordeaux, and would provide the Anglo-Gascon army with a base from which to carry the war to the French and sever communications between French forces north and south of the Dordogne. After eight years of defensive warfare by the Anglo-Gascons, there was no expectation among the French that they might make any offensive moves. Grosmont moved rapidly and took the French army at Bergerac by surprise on 26 August, decisively beating them in a running battle. French casualties were heavy, with many killed or captured. Derby's share of the prisoner ransoms and the loot was estimated at £34,000, approximately four times the annual income from his lands. (Note: For comparison, Edward III's annual income was often less than £50,000.)

Grosmont left a large garrison in the town and moved north with 6,000–8,000 men to Périgueux, the provincial capital of Périgord, which Grosmont blockaded, taking several strongholds on the main routes into the city. John, Duke of Normandy, the son and heir of Philip VI, gathered an army reportedly numbering over 20,000 and manoeuvred in the area. In early October a very large detachment relieved the city, drove off Grosmont's force and started besieging the English-held strongpoints. A French force of 7,000 besieged the castle of Auberoche, 9 miles (14 km) east of Périgueux. A messenger got through to Grosmont, who was already returning to the area with a scratch force of 1,200 English and Gascon soldiers: 400 men-at-arms and 800 mounted archers.

After a night march Grosmont attacked the French camp on 21 October while they were at dinner, taking the French by surprise. There was a protracted hand-to-hand struggle, which ended when the commander of the small English garrison in the castle sortied and fell upon the rear of the French. They broke and fled. Derby's mounted men-at-arms pursued them relentlessly. French casualties are uncertain but heavy. They are described by modern historians as "appalling", "extremely high", "staggering", and "heavy". Many French nobles were taken prisoner; lower ranking men were, as was customary, put to the sword. The ransoms alone made a fortune for many of the soldiers in Grosmont's army, as well as Grosmont himself, who was said to have made at least £50,000 from the day's captives. The Earl of Pembroke arrived after hostilities had ceased; Grosmont greeted him with the words, "cousin Pembroke, welcome. You are just in time to sprinkle holy water upon the dead."

Grosmont's four-month campaign has been described as "the first successful land campaign of ... the Hundred Years' War", which had commenced more than eight years earlier. Modern historians have praised the generalship demonstrated by Grosmont in this campaign: "superb and innovative tactician"; "ris[ing] to the level of genius"; "brilliant in the extreme"; "stunning"; "brilliant".

=== 1346 ===
Map of route of Lancaster's chevauchée of 1346

The Duke of Normandy was placed in charge of all French forces in southwest France in 1346, as he had been the previous autumn. In March 1346 a French army under Duke John, numbering between 15,000 and 20,000, enormously superior to any force the Anglo-Gascons could field, marched on the town of Aiguillon and besieged it on 1 April. The town commanded the junction of the Rivers Garonne and Lot, meaning it was not possible for the French to sustain an offensive further into Gascony unless the town was taken. On 2 April an arrière-ban, a formal call to arms for all able-bodied males, was announced for southern France. Grosmont, now known as Lancaster rather than Derby after the death of his father, (Note: During the 1345 campaign he was known as the Earl of Derby, but his father died in September 1345 and he became the Earl of Lancaster. Sumption 1990, p. 476) sent an urgent appeal for help to Edward. Edward was not only morally obliged to succour his vassal, but also contractually required to; his indenture with Lancaster stated that if Lancaster were attacked by overwhelming numbers, then Edward "shall rescue him in one way or another".

The garrison of Aiguillon, some 900 men, sortied repeatedly to interrupt the French operations, while Lancaster concentrated the main Anglo-Gascon force at La Réole, some 30 miles (48 km) away, as a threat. Duke John was never able to fully blockade the town, and found that his own supply lines were seriously harassed. On one occasion Lancaster used his main force to escort a large supply train into the town.

In July the main English army landed in northern France and moved towards Paris. Philip VI repeatedly ordered his son, Duke John, to break off the siege and bring his army north. Duke John, considering it a matter of honour, refused. By August, the French supply system had broken down, there was a dysentery epidemic in their camp, desertion was rife and Philip's orders were becoming imperious. On 20 August the French abandoned the siege and their camp and marched away. Six days later the main French army was decisively beaten in the Battle of Crécy with very heavy losses, before Duke John's army could reinforce them. The English then laid siege to the port of Calais.

Philip vacillated: on the day the siege of Calais began he disbanded most of his army, to save money and was convinced that Edward had finished his chevauchée (large-scale mounted raid) and would proceed to Flanders to ship his army home. On or shortly after 7 September, Duke John made contact with Philip, having shortly before disbanded his own army. On 9 September Philip announced that the army would reassemble at Compiègne on 1 October, an impossibly short interval, and then march to the relief of Calais. Among other consequences, this equivocation allowed Grosmont in the south-west to launch offensives into Quercy and the Bazadais; and himself lead a chevauchée 160 miles (260 km) north through Saintonge, Aunis and Poitou, capturing numerous towns, castles and smaller fortified places and storming the rich city of Poitiers. These offensives completely disrupted the French defences in the region and shifted the focus of the fighting from the heart of Gascony to 60 miles (97 km) or more beyond its borders. Few French troops had arrived at Compiègne by 1 October and as Philip and his court waited for the numbers to swell, news of Lancaster's conquests came in. Believing that Lancaster was heading for Paris, the French changed the assembly point for any men not already committed to Compiègne to Orléans, and reinforced them with some of those already mustered, to block this. After Lancaster turned south to head back to Gascony, those Frenchmen already at or heading towards Orléans were redirected to Compiègne; French planning collapsed into chaos.

== Duke of Lancaster ==
Coats of Arms of Edmund Crouchback, Earl of Lancaster, and his successors

In 1345, while Grosmont was in France, his father died. The younger Henry was now Earl of Lancaster – the wealthiest and most powerful peer of the realm. He also inherited the Barony of Halton. After he participated in the Siege of Calais in 1347, the king honoured Lancaster by including him as a founding member and the second knight of the Order of the Garter in 1348. In the same year Alice de Lacy died and her life holdings (which she had retained after Thomas of Lancaster was executed), including the Honour of Bolingbroke and Bolingbroke Castle, passed to Grosmont. In 1351 Edward bestowed an even greater honour on Lancaster when he created him Duke of Lancaster. The title of duke was of relatively new origin in England; only one other English ducal title had previously existed. (Note: This was the Duke of Cornwall, also created by Edward III, for his son and heir Edward, the Black Prince, in 1337. Before that, early Norman kings of England had been Duke of Normandy, but this had been a French title.) (Note: Both Henry of Grosmont and John of Gaunt are listed as the 1st Duke of Lancaster. This is because the dukedom could only be passed down to a son; when Henry of Grosmont died on 23 March 1361, the earldom passed to his son-in-law John of Gaunt but the dukedom expired. Edward III created a new dukedom with an identical name for his son John of Gaunt on 13 November 1362.)

In addition to this, the dukedom was given palatinate powers over the county of Lancashire, which entitled Grosmont to administer it virtually independently of the crown. This grant was quite exceptional in English history; only two other counties palatine existed in England: Durham, which was an ancient episcopal palatinate, and Chester, which was held by the crown. It is a sign of Edward's high regard for Lancaster that he bestowed such extensive privileges on him. The two men were second cousins through their great-grandfather King Henry III and practically coeval (Edward was born in 1312), so it is natural to assume that a strong sense of camaraderie existed between them. Another factor that might have influenced the King's decision was the fact that Henry had no male heir, so the grant of the dukedom was effectively made for Grosmont's lifetime only, and not expected to be hereditary.

=== 1350–1352 ===
Grosmont was present at the naval victory at the Battle of Winchelsea in 1350. The King, Gaunt, Prince Edward and Grosmont each commanded their own ship; during the course of the battle where he allegedly saved the lives of the Black Prince and John of Gaunt, sons of Edward III. This vignette is one of the few we have of the battle, courtesy of Froissart, although the latter calls them picturesque. The last years of the decade were spent jousting on the continent, but by 1351 Grosmont had undertaken a crusade to Prussia, and while there, decided to join the Teutonic knights. However, he was captured and forced to pay a ransom of 30,000 crowns. By the time he arrived in Prussia, a truce had been signed with the heretics. He intended to return then to England, possibly via Poland, although he may have fought a separate campaign in Lithuania first. Heinrich von Herford reports that, soon after leaving the north, the Duke's vanguard was robbed by Lithuanian knights, hence his decision to return to England through Cologne. Here he quarrelled with Otto, Duke of Brunswick, whom he publicly accused of intending to kidnap him in Westphalia. This almost led to a duel between the two men in Paris, which was only averted by the personal intervention of the French king John who, Fowler suggests, was himself unclear which one was the injured party—Grosmont for his original accusation of kidnapping, or Brunswick for his unchivalric intimidation. In the event, John held that Grosmont was the offended party. Travelling to Paris with a retinue of 50 knights, he was met sumpuously. Although John attempted to reconcile the two dukes, this proved impossible; it was not until the day of the joust that he declared the meeting void, with neither costs nor penalty for either to pay. While Grosmont's duel may have come to nothing, argues Fowler, more importantly, his lengthy sojourn abroad allowed him to do intelligence on the French court and assess its military or political divisions.

== 1356 ==
=== Normandy ===
Between then and 1355, Grosmont's time and energies were mainly spent acting in a diplomatic capacity to the Papal Curia following the death of Pope Clement in December 1352 and the complex election of his successor, Innocent VI, whose overarching strategy was peace between France and England. With the collapse of 1354's Treaty of Guînes, this policy proved unsuccessful, and by the following year full-scale war between England and France flared up again. On the English side, this may have been in part due to Grosmont's intelligence reports, in which he probably reported the divisions in the French aristocracy under John while emphasising the useful contact he had made and the friendly overtures he had received from Charles, the new King of Navarre, who owned several strong—and strongly garrisoned—castles in Normandy, all of whose castellans, reports Rogers, "were behind Edward to a man". It was not long, indeed, that money and enthusiasm for the war were running out in France. The modern historian Jonathan Sumption describes the French national administration as "fall[ing] apart in jealous acrimony and recrimination". Much of the north of France was openly defying John and a contemporary chronicler recorded "the King of France was severely hated in his own realm". Arras rebelled and its citizens killed loyalists. The major nobles of Normandy refused to pay taxes. On 5 April 1356 they were dining at the table of John's eldest son (the dauphin), Charles, when John arrived, accompanied by armed men, and arrested ten of the most outspoken; four were summarily executed. One of those imprisoned was the notoriously treacherous Charles of Navarre, one of the largest landholders in Normandy. (Note: Known as "Charles the Bad", he had repeatedly plotted with the English and in 1354 had murdered the Constable of France, one of John's closest advisors, in his bedroom and boasted of it.) The Norman nobles who had not been arrested sent to Navarre for reinforcements. On receiving news of this, Louis began raising troops. The Norman nobles also turned to Edward for assistance. John's army took control of most of Normandy and laid siege to those rebel-held fortifications which refused to surrender. John's son Charles, who as well as being the dauphin was the Duke of Normandy, took charge of suppressing these holdouts.

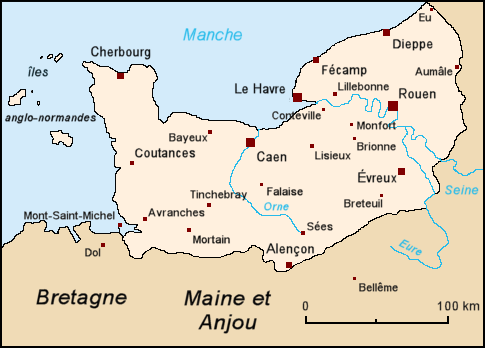
The Duchy of Normandy

Navarre's partisans negotiated an alliance with Edward. The English had been preparing an expedition to Brittany under Grosmont, as part of the War of the Breton Succession. Edward diverted this to Normandy to support the French rebels. On 1 June 1356 an initial force of 140 men-at-arms, 200 archers and 1,400 horses left Southampton in 48 ships for the beaches near St. Vaast la Hogue in the north-east Cotentin. Horses transported in the ships of the day needed several days rest to recover, otherwise, they were liable to collapse, or even die, when ridden. On 18 June Grosmont arrived and brought the English strength up to 500 men-at-arms and 800 longbowmen. They were reinforced by 200 Normans under Philip of Navarre. The English commander Robert Knolles joined Lancaster in Montebourg with a further 800 men detached from English garrisons in Brittany. The historian Clifford Rogers suggests that these 2,300 men (Note: Lancaster's initial force of 2,300 men was made up of 900 men-at-arms and 1,400 archers, the latter mostly longbowmen.) were reinforced by up to 1,700 men from Navarrese-held fortifications over the following month.

=== Chevauchée ===
Lancaster's main objective was to relieve the besieged Navarrese strongholds of Pont-Audemer, Breteuil and Tillières-sur-Avre. Lancaster's small army set off into French-controlled Normandy on 24 June. Their journey took the form of a chevauchée. All participants were mounted and moved relatively rapidly for armies of the period. Villages were looted and razed, as were towns and fortifications weak enough to be easily captured; stronger places were ignored. Parties spread out from the main line of travel so that a broad swathe of France was pillaged and devastated. Lancaster was prepared for a set-piece battle if necessary, but was not actively seeking one. His small army arrived at Pont-Audemer after covering more than 84 miles (135 km) in four days. The town was close to falling, as the French had nearly succeeded in driving mines under its walls. They fled on hearing of Lancaster's approach, abandoning their baggage and siege equipment. The English spent two days provisioning the town and filling in the French excavations. Detaching 100 men to reinforce the garrison, Lancaster marched south on 2 July. On the 4th he reached Conches-en-Ouche, stormed it and razed it. The next day Breteuil was reached, its besiegers having retired in good order, and was resupplied sufficiently to stand a siege for a year.

Meanwhile, John had left Chartres with a large force, initially establishing himself at Mantes. When Lancaster marched east, John believed he was striking for Rouen, and moved his army there. John also took steps to block the fords across the Seine, in the belief Lancaster may have been heading for Calais. Once it became clear Lancaster was moving south from Pont-Audemer, John followed. Just 7 miles (10 km) to the south of Breteuil was the capital of lower Normandy, Verneuil. The English continued their march on 4 July to Verneuil, seized it, looted it and took prisoner anyone whom it was considered might be worth a ransom. The richest men in the district had fortified themselves in Verneuil's strong keep (Note: The Grey Tower (Tour Grise); it had been constructed by the English king Henry I (r. 1100–1135)) with their families and valuables. The historian Alfred Burne hypothesises that French siege equipment had been captured at Pont-Audemer and made storming fortified places a more viable proposition than earlier in the chevauchée, when they were avoided. In any event, the keep was assaulted; many English are recorded as being wounded, but none were killed. At 6:00 am on the 6th its defenders negotiated a surrender: they were permitted to leave, but on condition they abandon all of their possessions. These were looted and the keep was then demolished. The attack on Verneuil was probably motivated by the prospect of looting a rich town; no attempt was made to relieve Navarrese-held Tillières-sur-Avre, 7 miles (11 km) to the east.

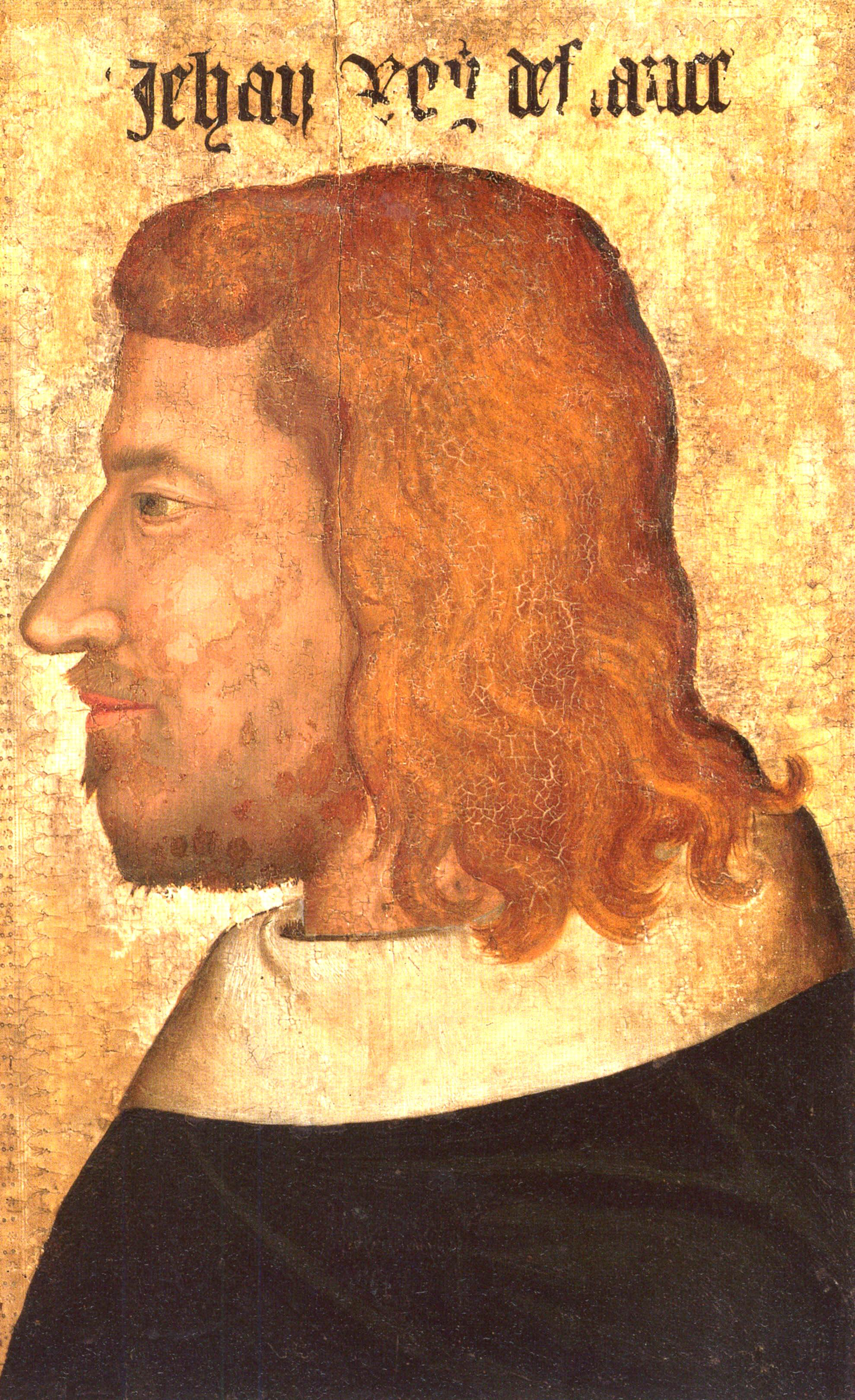
A contemporary image of John II

By the time the demolition of the keep at Verneuil was complete, on the evening of 6 July, reports on the approach of the French army were being received. It was much stronger than the English force; Rogers describes it as "vastly superior ... in numbers" with perhaps ten times the number of men. It had moved to Condé-sur-Iton from Rouen and so was 3 miles (5 km) from the freshly provisioned Breteuil and only 7 miles (11 km) from Verneuil. On the 7th Lancaster rested his men and horses, but they did so in battle order outside Verneuil in case of a French attack. The French at Condé-sur-Iton also rested, having marched hard to get there in two days from Rouen; John probably also wished for all of his stragglers and detachments to join his army before offering battle. On the 8th the English marched 14 miles (23 km) west to L'Aigle. The French army was 2 or 3 miles (3 to 5 km) away. John sent heralds to Lancaster inviting him to commit his force to a formal battle. Lancaster replied ambiguously, but John, convinced that Lancaster's main reason for landing in Normandy was to seek a battle, believed an agreement to fight the next day had been reached and camped for the night. (Note: Grosmont having spent the day of the 7th stationary and in battle order outside Verneuil probably contributed to John's belief that the English were eager for battle.)

The next morning the French prepared themselves for battle, watched from a distance by a detachment of Navarrese cavalry, and moved off at noon. The English had broken camp during the night and set off on a long march of 28 miles (45 km) to Argentan. Attempting a pursuit was clearly hopeless, so the French returned to Breteuil and re-established their siege. A force was sent to Tillières-sur-Avre, which promptly capitulated. The English returned to Montebourg on 13 July. In 22 days the English had travelled 330 miles (530 km), a remarkable effort for the period. The three-week expedition had been very successful: two of the besieged towns had been resupplied, the participants had seized a large amount of loot, including many horses, damage had been done to the French economy and prestige, the alliance with the Norman nobles had been cemented, there had been few casualties and the French King had been distracted from the Black Prince's preparations for a greater chevauchée in south-west France.

=== Loire campaign ===
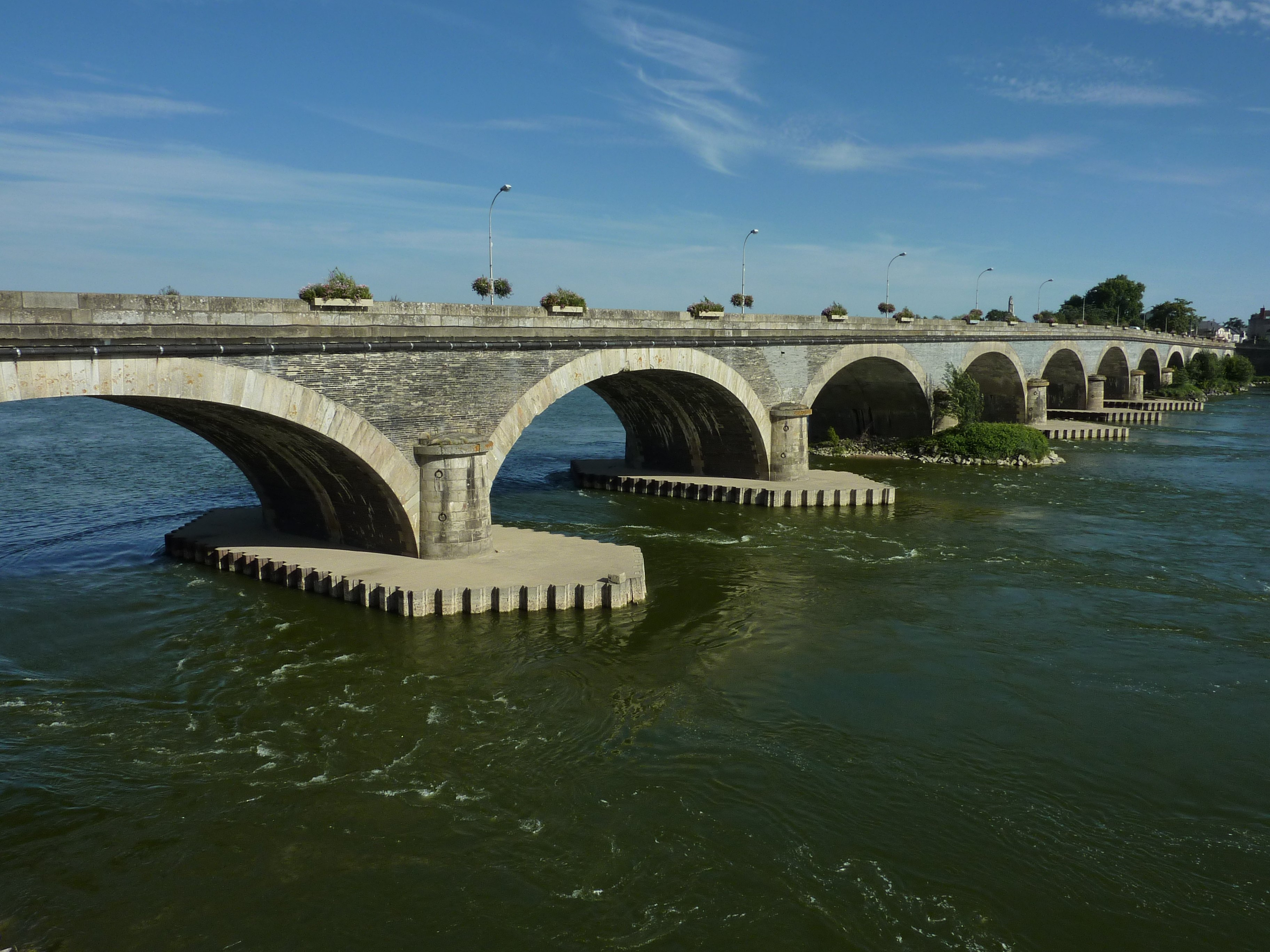
The 19th-century Dumnacus Bridge over the Loire at Les Ponts-de-Cé

In August 1356 Grosmont marched south from eastern Brittany in another chevauchée. It was his intention to join the army of Edward, the Black Prince, the eldest son of Edward III. This had marched north from Bergerac on 8 August. It was planned that the two would meet in the general vicinity of Tours. (Burne 1999, pp. 276, 278 Fowler 1969, p. 156) Grosmont brought 2,500 men with him from Normandy. He also had under his command over 2,000 men garrisoning the English-held fortifications of Brittany. The extent to which he added the men from these garrisons to the troops from Normandy is not known. Due to the unseasonable fullness of the River Loire, across which the French had destroyed or strongly fortified all the bridges, Lancaster was unable to effect a junction. In early September he abandoned the attempt to force a crossing at Les Ponts-de-Cé and returned to Brittany. En route he captured and garrisoned a substantial number of French strong-points.

The Black Prince also returned towards his starting point, but his delay while waiting for Lancaster near Tours enabled a French army under the command of their king to overtake him. As a result, the Prince was forced to commit to the Battle of Poitiers, where the French were heavily defeated and King John was captured.

== 1356–1360 ==
Returning to Brittany from the Loire campaign, Grosmont laid siege to its capital, Rennes. He participated in the last great offensive of the first phase of the Hundred Years' War: the Reims campaign of 1359–1360. He was then appointed principal negotiator for the Treaty of Brétigny. This marked the end of the first phase of the Hundred Years' War, with the English achieving very favourable terms.

== Death and burial ==
After returning to England in November 1360, he fell ill early the next year, and died at Leicester Castle on 23 March 1361. It is possible that the cause of death was the plague, which that year was making a second visitation to England. Mortimer argues against the plague being the cause of death, as Grosmont made his will ten days before his death, a space of time inconsistent with the usual swift progress of the plague. In addition, his illness and death in early 1361 is inconsistent with reports of the plague’s spread in England beginning in May. He was buried in the Church of the Annunciation of Our Lady of the Newarke, which he had built next to Leicester Castle, within the religious and charitable institution founded by his father, and where he had reburied his father some years previously.

By the time of his death, Grosmont had participated in 15 military missions, leading 6 of them; been the King's lieutenant 7 times; led 6 significant embassies; and taken part in 12 truce conferences. The Chronique des quatre premiers Valois, a chronicle written thirty-five years after his death, describes him as "one of the best warriors in the world".

== Personal life ==
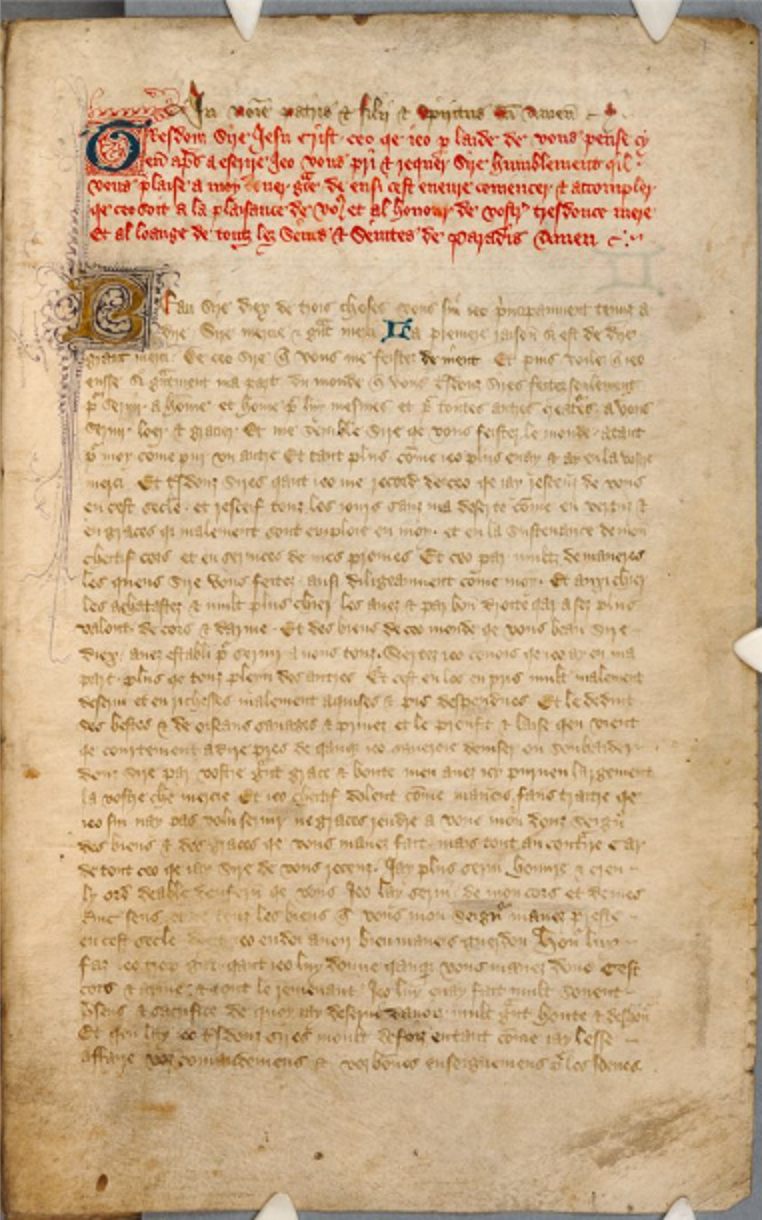
First page of the Livre, from Cambridge, Corpus Christi College, MS 218

Grosmont's mother died when he was about 12 and he first appears in official records at the age of 14. At about age 18, he married Isabel of Beaumont; daughter of Henry de Beaumont, Earl of Buchan and veteran campaigner of the First War of Scottish Independence. He and Isabel had two daughters. The eldest was Maud of Lancaster (4 April 1340 – 10 April 1362), who married William I, Duke of Bavaria in 1352. The younger was Blanche of Lancaster (25 March 1345/1347 – 12 September 1368), who married her third cousin John of Gaunt (1340–1399), the third of five surviving sons of Edward III. Gaunt inherited Lancaster's possessions, and he was granted the ducal title the following year, but it was not until 1377, when Edward was largely incapacitated, that Gaunt was able to recover the palatinate rights for the County of Lancaster. When Gaunt's son by Blanche, Henry of Bolingbroke, usurped the crown in 1399 and became King Henry IV, the vast Lancaster inheritance, including the Honour of Bolingbroke and the Lordship of Bowland, was merged with the Crown as the Duchy of Lancaster, which survives to this day as the holding entity for the monarch's private investment assets.

== Character ==
More is known about Lancaster's character than that of most of his contemporaries through his memoirs, the Livre de Seyntz Medicines ("Book of the Holy Doctors"), a highly personal treatise on matters of religion and piety, also containing details of historical interest. It reveals that Lancaster, at the age of 44 when he wrote the book in 1354, suffered from gout. The book is primarily a devotional work, organised around seven wounds which Henry claimed to have received, representing the seven deadly sins. Lancaster confesses to his sins, explains various real and mythical medical remedies in terms of their theological symbolism, and exhorts the reader to greater morality.

== Genealogical table ==
A third generation of the House of Lancaster, Henry was related to the most prominent people in early 14th-century England.

Henry III of England	Eleanor of Provence
Edward I of England	Henry I of Navarre	Blanche of Artois	Edmund Crouchback
Philip IV of France	Joan I of Navarre	Thomas of Lancaster	Henry of Lancaster
Edward II of England	Isabella of France
Edward III of England	Henry of Grosmont

== Notes ==
Political offices
Preceded by Earl of Lancaster	Lord High Steward; 1345–1361	Succeeded by Duke of Lancaster
Peerage of England
New creation	1st Earl of Derby (2nd creation); 1337–1361	Succeeded by John of Gaunt
Preceded by Henry of Lancaster	4th Earl of Leicester (2nd creation); 1345–1361	Succeeded by John of Gaunt
Preceded by Henry of Lancaster	4th Earl of Lancaster (1st creation); 1345–1351	Succeeded by John of Gaunt
New creation	Duke of Lancaster (1st creation); 1351–1361	Succeeded by Dukedom expired, then John of Gaunt
