= Scheldt campaigns of 1339–1340 =

Campaign during the Hundred Years' War

Scheldt campaigns (1339-1340)
- Part of the Hundred Years' War
Date	December 1339 – June 1340
Location	Picardy, France
Result	Inconclusive

Belligerents
Flanders; England	France

Commanders and leaders
William, Count of Hainaut	King Philip VI

Strength
Unknown	Unknown

The Scheldt campaigns of 1339–1340 were a series of manoeuvres by opposing French and Flemish forces during the Hundred Years' War.

== Background ==
Following a series of disagreements between Philip VI of France (r. 1328–1350) and Edward III of England (r. 1327–1377) regarding the status of English-held lands in south-west France, on 24 May 1337 Philip's Great Council in Paris declared that they were forfeit. This marked the start of the Hundred Years' War, which was to last 116 years. Edward attempted to assemble an alliance of nobles and small states to the north and east of France, including Flanders, which at the time was a province of France. Many of Edward's would-be allies had acknowledged Philip as their liege lord and were reluctant to renege on this. To overcome this, on 26 January 1340 Edward revived a claim to the French throne and had himself crowned king of France.

== Campaign ==
The French assembled an army, which based itself in the city of Cambrai, on the Scheldt. Several Flemish forces, supplemented by some English troops and leaders, manoeuvred against the French city of Tournai, with little success.

== Citations and sources ==
=== Sources ===
- Rogers, Clifford (2014) [2000]. War Cruel and Sharp: English Strategy under Edward III, 1327–1360. Woodbridge, Suffolk: Boydell Press. ISBN 978-0851158044.
- Sumption, Jonathan (1990). Trial by Battle. London: Faber & Faber. ISBN 978-0-571-20095-5.
- Wagner, John A. (2006a). "Hundred Years' War, Causes of". Encyclopedia of the Hundred Years War. Woodbridge, Suffolk: Greenwood. pp. 157–159. ISBN 978-0313327360.
- Wagner, John A. (2006b). "Hundred Years' War, Phases of". Encyclopedia of the Hundred Years War. Woodbridge, Suffolk: Greenwood. pp. 160–164. ISBN 978-0313327360.
