= Thiérache campaign =

Military campaign of 1339 during the Hundred Years' War

Thiérache campaign Chevauchée of Edward III of 1339
- Part of the Hundred Years' War
Date	20 September – 24 October 1339
Location	Northern France
Result	English withdrawal

Belligerents
Kingdom of England; County of Flanders; Holy Roman Empire; County of Hainaut	Kingdom of France

Commanders and leaders
King Edward III	King Philip VI

The Thiérache campaign, also known as the chevauchée of Edward III of 1339, was the march from Valenciennes, Hainault across Cambrésis, Picardy and Thiérache in northern France by an English army with Flemish, Hainault and Holy Roman Empire allies. It began on 20 September 1339, resulting in the siege of Cambrai and ended with the withdrawal of the English forces on 24 October, 1339, into Brabant. The English army was led by King Edward III, and the French by King Philip VI. It was a campaign during the Hundred Years' War.

== Aftermath ==
Duke John of Normandy led a French army through Hainault in revenge for their support of Edward III. The French progress was halted by the garrison of Le Quesnoy by the use of cannon. A Flemish army led by Jacques van Artevelde, with Robert de Ufford, Earl of Suffolk and William Montagu, Earl of Salisbury, was ambushed on the way to Valenciennes; the Earls of Suffolk and Salisbury were captured and taken prisoner to Paris. Philip VI joined the French army and marched to meet the Flemish army. News arrived that the French fleet had been annihilated during the naval encounter at Sluys, with the French army then retreating to Arras.
