= Chronique des quatre premiers Valois =

Start of the Chronique in the only manuscript

The Chronique des quatre premiers Valois is an Old French chronicle covering the years 1327–1393. This corresponds to the reigns of the French kings Philip VI, John II, Charles V and Charles VI, the first four kings of the House of Valois. The chronicle ends with Charles VI's madness. It is known from a single manuscript copy of the 15th century, now in Paris, Bibliothèque Nationale de France, Français 10468. The Chronique was ignored from its completion until the discovery of the manuscript by Siméon Luce, who published an edition in 1862, supplying it with the title by which it is now known.

Two remarks in the Chronique indicate that it was written in the period 1377–1397, while Richard II was ruling England and Philip of Alençon was archbishop of Auch. The author does not identify himself or his location, but numerous references to Rouen strongly suggest that he was working there. Luce argued that he was in all probability a clergyman.

The Chronique contains few details and no original information prior to 1350. After that, it is a valuable source of original information. This does not extend, however, to its account of events in Spain.

== Bibliography ==
- Luce, Siméon, ed. (1862). Chronique des quatre premiers Valois (1327–1393). Paris.
- Villalon, Andrew; Kagay, Donald (2017). To Win and Lose a Medieval Battle: Nájera (April 3, 1367), a Pyrrhic Victory for the Black Prince. Brill.
