= Adam Murimuth =

English chronicler

Adam Murimuth (1274/75 – 1347) was an English ecclesiastic and chronicler.

== Life ==
He was born in 1274 or 1275 and studied civil law at the University of Oxford. Between 1312 and 1318 he practised in the papal curia at Avignon. King Edward II of England and Archbishop Robert Winchelsey were among his clients, and his legal services secured for him canonries at Hereford and St Paul's, and the precentorship of Exeter Cathedral. In 1331 he retired to country living (in Wraysbury, Buckinghamshire), and devoted himself to writing the history of his own times.

== Works ==
The chronicle he wrote of his times is entitled "Chronicon, sive res gestae sui temporis quibus ipse interfuit, res Romanas et Gallicas Anglicanis intertexens, 1302-1343" (Cottonian Library MSS., Claudius E VIII). His Continuatio chronicarum, begun not earlier than 1325, starts from the year 1303, and continues up to 1347, the year of his death. Meagre at first, it becomes fuller about 1340 and is specially valuable for the history of the French wars. Murimuth gives a bald narrative of events, incorporating many documents in the latter part of his book. The annals of St. Paul's edited by Bishop William Stubbs are closely related to the work of Murimuth, but probably not from his pen. The Continuatio was carried on, after his death, by an anonymous writer to the year 1380.

The only complete edition of the Continuatio chronicarum is that by Edward Maunde Thompson (Rolls series, 1889). The preface to this edition, and to William Stubbs's Chronicles of Edward I and II, vol. i. (Rolls series, 1882), should be consulted. The anonymous continuation is printed in Thomas Hog's edition of Murimuth (Eng. Hist. Soc., London, 1846).
