= Château d'Auberoche =

Coordinates: 45°12′32″N 0°53′45″E

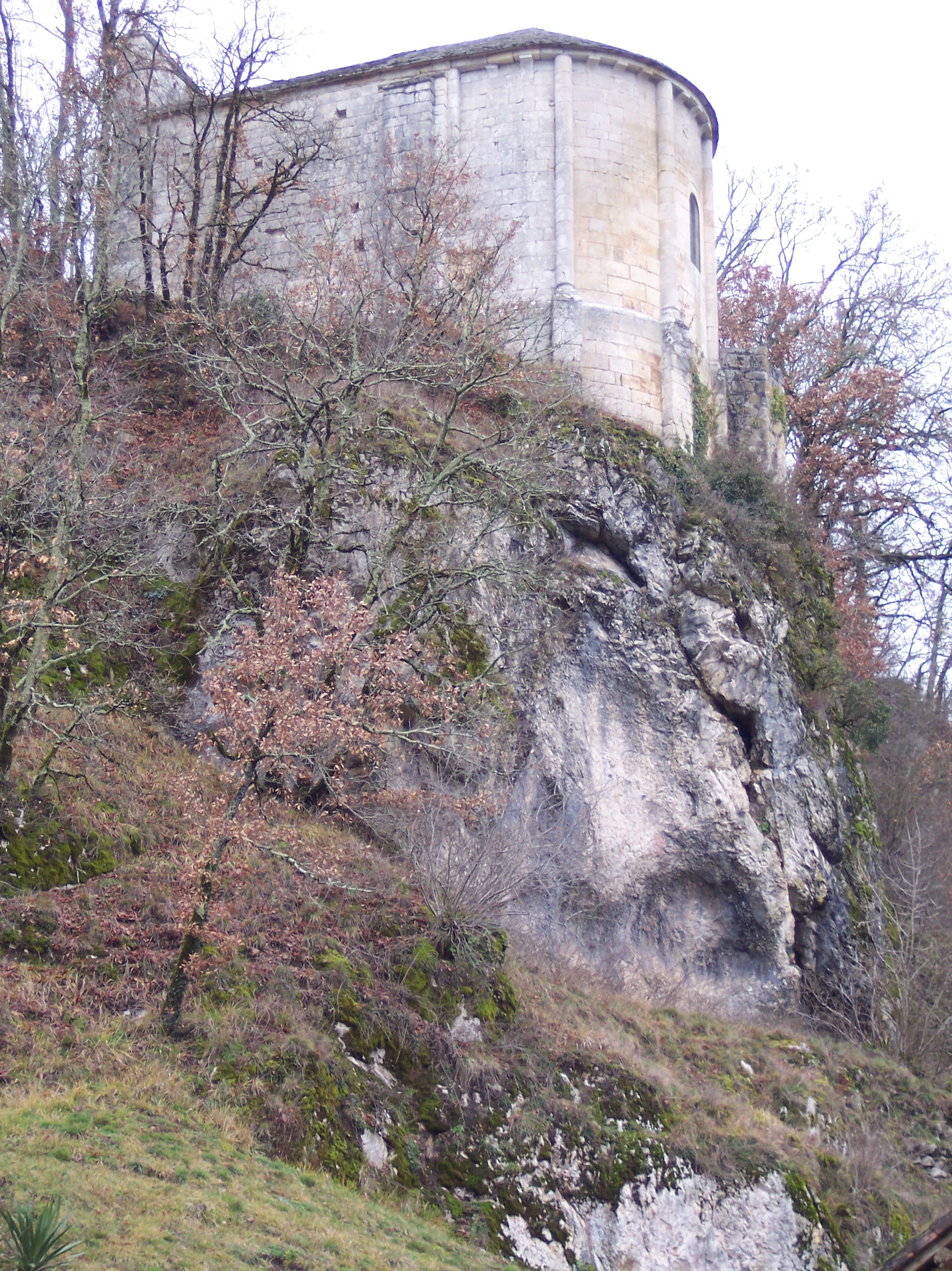

Château d'Auberoche is a château in Dordogne, Nouvelle-Aquitaine, France. It was the site of the 1345 Battle of Auberoche in the Edwardian phase of the Hundred Years' War.
