= Siege of Cambrai (1339) =

Battle during the Hundred Years' War

- Part of the Hundred Years War
Date	September–October 1339
Location	Cambrai, France 50°10′36″N 3°14′08″E
Result	French victory

Belligerents
Kingdom of England	Kingdom of France

Commanders and leaders
Edward III of England	Étienne de la Baume

The siege of Cambrai was undertaken by an English army led by King Edward III of England during September and October 1339 in the early stage of the Hundred Years War. At the time Cambrai, located in the Nord department of the Hauts-de-France region in France, was not part of France but a Free imperial city of the Holy Roman Empire.

In 1339, Cambrai became the centre of a struggle between supporters of the Louis IV, Holy Roman Emperor, and William II, Count of Hainaut, on the one hand, and those of king Philip VI of France on the other. Among Philip VI's allies were counts John I of Bohemia, Philip III of Navarre, Aymon, Count of Savoy, Humbert II of Viennois and vassals of King Alfonso XI of Castile and León. Cambrai had allowed the French to garrison the city with 300 men-at-arms.

Meanwhile, Edward III left Flanders in August 1339, where he had been on the continent since July 1338. Edward had asserted his rights to the throne of France, openly defying the authority of Philip VI. Wanting to satisfy his Bavarian allies, he decided to seize Cambrai. Edward asked the bishop of Cambrai, Guillaume d'Auxonne, a vassal of the Holy Roman Empire, to let him in, however the bishop also had instructions from Philip VI informing him to hold on for a few days until he arrived with a French army. Guillaume proclaimed his allegiance to France and prepared to resist a siege.

The defence of Cambrai was provided by the governor Étienne de la Baume, grand master of the crossbowmen of France. The French garrison had artillery comprising 10 guns, five of iron and five of other metals. This is one of the earliest references to the use of cannon in siege warfare.

Edward launched several attacks from 26 September, with Cambrai resisting every assault for five weeks.

When Edward learned on 6 October that Philip was approaching with a large army, he abandoned the siege on 8 October. He retreated across Picardy, devastating the plains of Cambresis along the way. A strong English garrison was left in the castle of Thun-l'Eveque. Edward then proceeded to Saint-Quentin. On 23 October, the armies of England and France faced each other across the plain between La Capelle and Buironfosse. They separated without engaging in battle.

== Bibliography ==
- J. Aicard, F. Bourquelot, A. Bravais, F. Chassériaux, A. Deloye, D. Denne-Baron, Desportes, P. Gervais, Jung, Léon Lalanne, Ludovic Lalanne, Le Chatelier, A. Le Pileur, Ch. Louandre, Ch. Martins, V. Raulin, F. Régnier, L. Vaudoyer et Ch. Vergé, Patria : La France ancienne et moderne morale et matérielle ou Collection encyclopédique et statistique de tous les faits relatifs à l'histoire physique et intellectuelle de la France et de ses colonies, Paris, 1847, p. 1244
- N. Chareyron, Jean le Bel maître de Froissart grand imagier de la Guerre de Cent Ans, Ed. De Boeck Université, Bruxelles, 1996, p. 220
- L. Figuier, Exposition et histoire des principales découvertes scientifiques, t. 3, 1858, p. 336
- A. Ch. N. de Lateyssonnière, Recherches historiques sur le département de l'Ain, t. 3, Bourg, 1841, pp. 284–293
- A. Guilbert, Histoire des villes de France, Paris, 1845, p. 274
- Pères Richard et Giraud, Bibliothèque Sacrée et Dictionnaire Universel, t. 20, Paris, 1827, p. 206
- C. Robert, Numismatique de Cambrai, Paris, 1861, p. 100
