= Lancaster's Normandy chevauchée of 1356 =

Campaign during the Hundred Years' War

- Part of the Edwardian Phase of the Hundred Years' War
Date	22 June – 13 July 1356
Location	Northern France

Belligerents
Kingdom of England	Kingdom of France

Commanders and leaders
Henry, Duke of Lancaster	John II

Strength
2,300–4,000	Unknown but very large

Casualties and losses
Few	Unknown

Lancaster's chevauchée of 1356 in Normandy was an English offensive directed by Henry, Duke of Lancaster, in northern France during 1356, as a part of the Hundred Years' War. The offensive took the form of a large mounted raid – a chevauchée – and lasted from 22 June to 13 July. During its final week the English were pursued by a much larger French army under King John II that failed to force them to battle.

King John had turned against a group of senior Normandy-based French nobles, headed by Charles II of Navarre, whom John believed to be treacherous. Seeing an opportunity, Edward III of England diverted an expedition planned for the Duchy of Brittany under Lancaster to the Cotentin Peninsula in north-west Normandy. From there, after gathering some local reinforcements, Lancaster set off south with 2,300 men. He then pillaged and burnt his way eastward across the Duchy of Normandy. King John moved to Rouen with a much stronger force, hoping to intercept Lancaster, but after relieving and supplying the besieged citadel of Pont-Audemer the English turned south. They supplied another friendly fortification, Breteuil, then stormed and sacked the important town of Verneuil-sur-Avre. John pursued but bungled several opportunities to bring the English to battle.

The English made long and rapid marches back to the safety of the northern Cotentin. In 22 days the English travelled 330 mi (530 km), a remarkable effort for the period. Two besieged fortifications had been supplied, the expedition had seized a large amount of loot, including many horses, damage had been done to the French economy and prestige, new alliances had been cemented, there had been few casualties and the French King had been distracted from the English preparations for a greater chevauchée from south-west France.

== Background ==
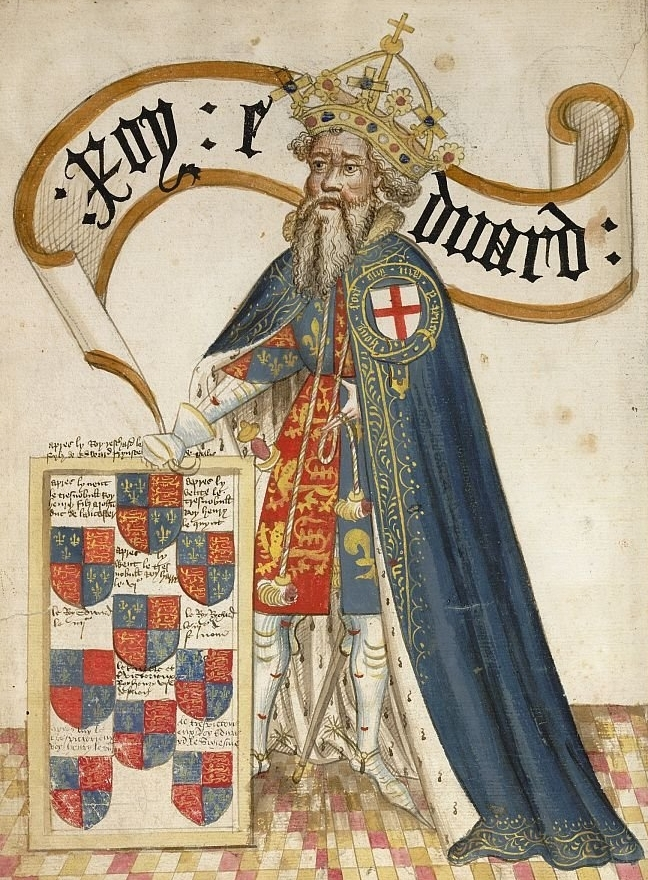
Edward III

Since the Norman Conquest of 1066, English monarchs had held titles and lands within France, the possession of which made them vassals of the kings of France. On 24 May 1337, following a series of disagreements between Philip VI of France (r. 1328–1350) and Edward III of England (r. 1327–1377), Philip's Great Council in Paris agreed that the lands held by Edward III in France should be taken into Philip's direct control on the grounds that Edward III was in breach of his obligations as a vassal. This marked the start of the Hundred Years' War, which was to last 116 years.

In 1346 Edward led an army across northern France, defeating the French at the Battle of Crécy and laying siege to the port of Calais. With French finances and morale low after Crécy, Philip failed to relieve the town and it surrendered on 3 August 1347. Following further inconclusive military manoeuvres by each side, and given that both sides were financially exhausted, emissaries despatched by Pope Clement VI found willing listeners. By 28 September the Truce of Calais, intended to bring a temporary halt to the fighting, had been agreed. This strongly favoured the English, confirming them in possession of all their territorial conquests. It was to run for nine months to 7 July 1348, but was extended repeatedly over the years until it was formally set aside in 1355. The truce did not stop ongoing naval clashes between the two countries, nor small-scale fighting in Gascony and the Duchy of Brittany, nor occasional fighting on a larger scale. A treaty ending the war was negotiated at Guînes and signed on 6 April 1354. The French king, now John II (r. 1350–1364), decided not to ratify it and it did not take effect. The latest extension to the truce was due to expire on 24 June. It was clear that from then both sides would be committed to full-scale war.

== Prelude ==
In April 1355, Edward and his council, with the treasury in an unusually favourable financial position, decided to launch offensives that year in both northern France and Gascony. John attempted to strongly garrison his northern towns and fortifications against the expected descent by Edward III, at the same time assembling a field army; after allocating garrisons the French field army was unimpressive, largely due to lack of money to recruit more men. An English expedition to Normandy was planned. It was to be carried out with the cooperation of the French magnate Charles II of Navarre, but Charles reneged on the agreement. Instead a chevauchée, a large-scale mounted raid, was attempted from the English enclave of Calais in November. The French King had stripped the area of fodder, food and potential booty, causing the English to return to Calais within ten days. The raid had achieved nothing, but did focus French attention on the north.

Edward III's eldest son, Edward of Woodstock, later commonly known as the Black Prince, was given the Gascon command and arrived in Bordeaux, the capital of English-held Gascony, on 20 September accompanied by 2,200 English soldiers. An Anglo-Gascon force of between 5,000 and 6,000 men marched from Bordeaux 300 miles (480 km) to Narbonne and back to Gascony. The Black Prince's chevauchée of 1355 devastated a wide swathe of French territory and sacked many French towns on the way. While no territory was captured, enormous economic damage was done to France; the modern historian Clifford Rogers concluded "the importance of the economic attrition of the chevauchée can hardly be exaggerated." The English component resumed the offensive after Christmas to great effect, and more than 50 French-held towns or fortifications in south-west France were captured during the following four months. Several local lords went over to the English, bringing a further 30 fortified places with them.

Money and enthusiasm for the war were running out in France. The modern historian Jonathan Sumption describes the French national administration as "fall[ing] apart in jealous acrimony and recrimination". Much of the north of France was openly defying John and a contemporary chronicler recorded "the King of France was severely hated in his own realm". Arras rebelled and its citizens killed loyalists. The major nobles of Normandy refused to pay taxes. On 5 April 1356 they were dining at the table of John's eldest son (the dauphin), Charles, when John arrived, accompanied by armed men, and arrested ten of the most outspoken; four were summarily executed. One of those imprisoned was the notoriously treacherous Charles of Navarre, one of the largest landholders in Normandy. (Note: Known as "Charles the Bad", he had repeatedly plotted with the English and in 1354 had murdered the constable of France, one of John's closest advisors, in his bedroom and boasted of it.) The Norman nobles who had not been arrested, sent to Navarre for reinforcements, where one of Charles' younger brothers, Louis, was administering the country. On receiving the news Louis began raising troops. The Norman nobles also turned to Edward for assistance.

== Chevauchée ==
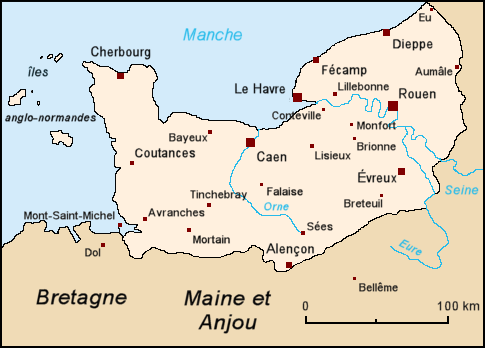
The Duchy of Normandy

John's army took control of most of Normandy and laid siege to those rebel-held fortifications which refused to surrender. John's son Charles, who as well as being the dauphin was the Duke of Normandy, took charge of suppressing these holdouts. He took personal command of the siege of Évreux, the capital of Navarre's holdings in Normandy as Count of Évreux. He ordered several assaults, which were unsuccessful. The town of Pont-Audemer was another of Navarre's Norman possessions which refused to surrender; it fell to a French force commanded by Robert de Houdetot, but the citadel held out. Houdetot also ordered assaults, which also failed, so he drove mines towards its walls in an attempt to sap them. Philip of Navarre, another younger brother of Charles of Navarre, took command of several adherents of his brother and withdrew to the northern Cotentin. The French King was at Chartres concentrating an army with which to respond to whatever moves the English might make. An arrière-ban, a formal call to arms for all able-bodied males, was announced on 14 May. The response was unenthusiastic and the call was repeated in late May and again in early June.

Navarre's partisans negotiated an alliance with Edward. The English had been preparing an expedition to Brittany under Henry, Duke of Lancaster, as part of the War of the Breton Succession; Edward diverted this to Normandy to support the French rebels. On 1 June an initial force of 140 men-at-arms, 200 archers and 1,400 horses left Southampton in 48 ships for the beaches near St. Vaast la Hogue in the north-east Cotentin, the same beaches on which the English had landed ten years earlier at the start of the Crécy campaign. Horses transported in the ships of the day needed several days rest to recover, otherwise they were liable to collapse, or even die, when ridden.

On 18 June 1356 Lancaster arrived and brought the strength up to 500 men-at-arms and 800 longbowmen. They were reinforced by 200 Normans under Philip of Navarre. The English commander Robert Knolles joined Lancaster in Montebourg with a further 800 men detached from English garrisons in Brittany. The historian Clifford Rogers suggests that these 2,300 men (Note: Lancaster's initial force of 2,300 men was made up of 900 men-at-arms and 1,400 archers, mostly longbowmen.) were reinforced by up to 1,700 men from Navarrese-held fortifications over the following month.

=== Outward ===
Map of Lancaster's route

Lancaster's main objective was to relieve the besieged Navarrese strongholds of Pont-Audemer, Breteuil, Tillières-sur-Avre and Évreux, by the time he landed only the first three places were still holding out. In early June Charles' army had launched a successful assault on Évreux; the Navarrese garrison withdrew to the citadel, burning most of the town behind them. They then negotiated the handover of the castle to Charles, in exchange for permission to join their comrades in Breteuil. Lancaster's small army was delayed for several days at Montebourg, setting off on 22 June and arriving the next day in Carentan, 25 miles (40 km) to the south. So far they had been in relatively friendly territory, but on the 24th they set off into French-controlled Normandy. Their journey took the form of a typical chevauchée of the time. All participants were mounted and moved relatively rapidly for armies of the period. Villages were looted and razed, as were towns and fortifications weak enough to be easily captured; stronger places were ignored. Parties spread out from the main line of travel, so that a broad swathe of France was pillaged and devastated. Lancaster was prepared for a set-piece battle if necessary, but was not actively seeking one.

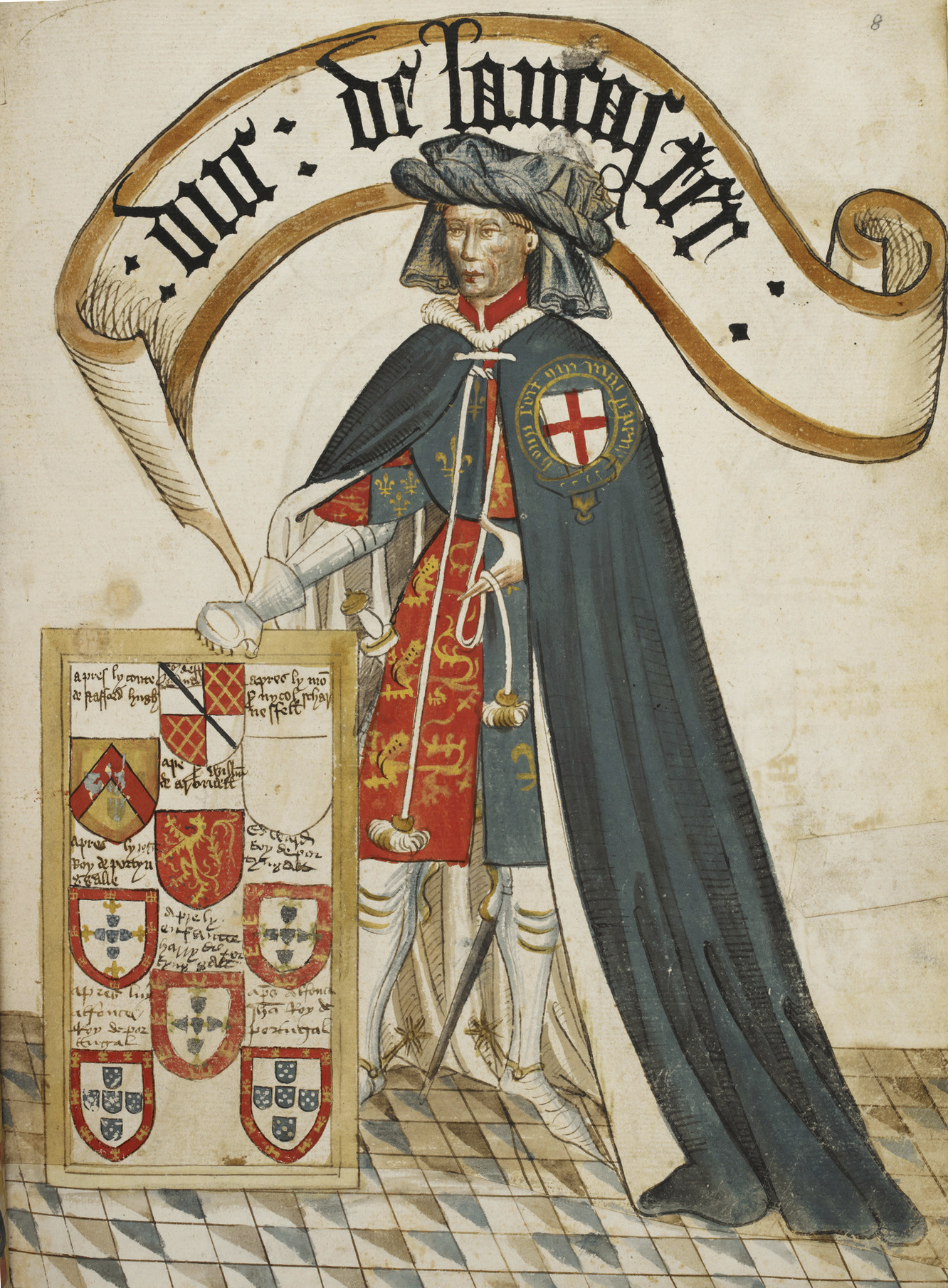
Henry of Grosmont, Duke of Lancaster

On 24 June the English force headed south, crossed the Vire at Torigni-sur-Vire, and halted there for the 25th. On the 26th they turned east, burning their way through western Normandy and crossing the strongly fortified bridge over the Dives after the French garrison abandoned it. Lancaster's small army arrived at Pont-Audemer four days after leaving Torigni-sur-Vire, which was some 84 miles (135 km) distant in a straight line. The town was close to falling, as the French had nearly succeeded in driving their mines under its walls. They fled on hearing of Lancaster's approach, abandoning their baggage and siege equipment. The English spent two days provisioning the town and filling in the French excavations. Detaching 100 men to reinforce the garrison, Lancaster marched south on 2 July. On the 4th he reached Conches-en-Ouche, stormed it and razed it. The next day Breteuil was reached, its besiegers having retired in good order, and it was resupplied sufficiently to stand a siege for a year.

Meanwhile, John had left Chartres with a large force, initially establishing himself at Mantes. When Lancaster marched east, John believed he was striking for Rouen, and moved his army there. He also took steps to block the fords across the Seine, in the belief Lancaster may have been heading for Calais. Once it became clear Lancaster was moving south from Pont-Audemer, John followed. Just 7 miles (10 km) to the south of Breteuil was the capital of lower Normandy, Verneuil. The English continued their march on 4 July to Verneuil, seized it, looted it and took prisoner anyone who it was considered might be worth a ransom. The richest men in the district had fortified themselves in Verneuil's strong keep (Note: The Grey Tower (Tour Grise); it had been constructed by the English king Henry I (r. 1100–1135)) with their families and valuables. The historian Alfred Burne hypothesised that French siege equipment had been captured at Pont-Audemer and made storming fortified places a more viable proposition than earlier in the chevauchée, when they were avoided. In any event, the keep was assaulted; many English are recorded as being wounded, but none killed. At 6:00 am on the 6th its defenders negotiated a surrender: they were permitted to leave, but on condition they abandon all their possessions. These were looted and the keep was then demolished. The attack on Verneuil was probably motivated by the prospect of looting a rich town; no attempt was made to relieve Navarrese-held Tillières-sur-Avre, 7 miles (11 km) to the east.

=== Return ===
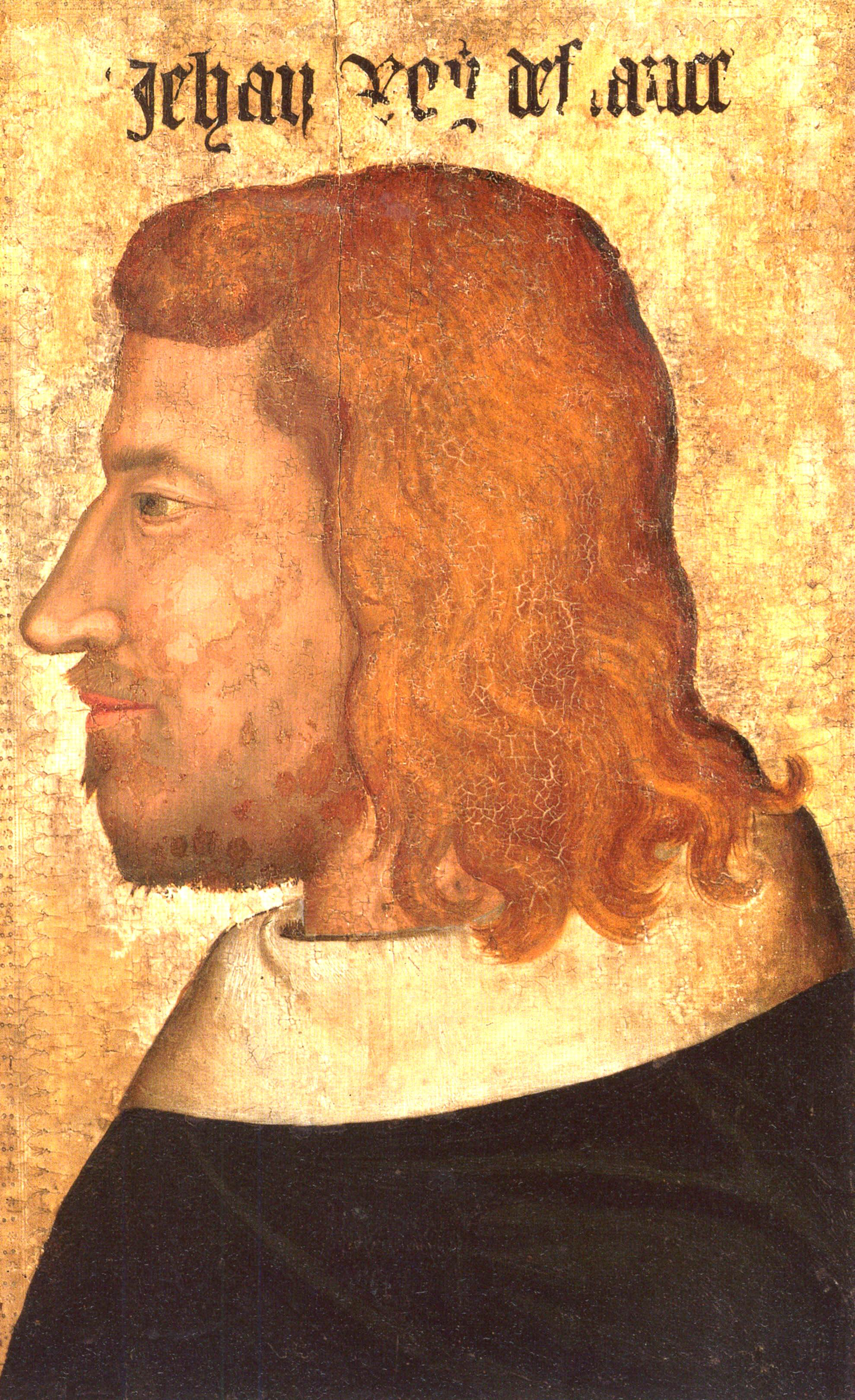
A contemporary image of John II

By the time the demolition of the keep at Verneuil was complete, on the evening of 6 July, reports on the approach of the French army were being received. It was much stronger than the English force; Rogers describes it as "vastly superior ... in numbers" with perhaps ten times the number of men. It had moved to Condé-sur-Iton from Rouen and so was 3 miles (5 km) from the freshly provisioned Breteuil and only 7 miles (11 km) from Verneuil. On the 7th Lancaster rested his men and horses, but they did so in battle order outside Verneuil in case of a French attack. The French at Condé-sur-Iton also rested, having marched hard to get there in two days from Rouen; John probably also wished for all his stragglers and detachments to join his army before offering battle. On the 8th the English marched 14 miles (23 km) west to L'Aigle. The French army was 2 to 3 miles (3 to 5 km) away. John sent heralds to Lancaster inviting him to commit his force to a formal battle. Lancaster replied ambiguously, but John, convinced that Lancaster's main reason for landing in Normandy was to seek a battle, believed an agreement had been reached and camped for the night. (Note: Lancaster having spent the day of the 7th stationary in battle order outside Verneuil probably contributed to John's belief that the English were eager for battle.)

The next morning the French prepared themselves for battle, watched from a distance by a detachment of Navarrese cavalry, and moved off at noon. The English had broken camp during the night and set off on a long march of 28 miles (45 km) to Argentan. Attempting a pursuit was clearly hopeless, so the French returned to Breteuil and re-established their siege. A force was sent to Tillières-sur-Avre, which promptly capitulated. Some French cavalry were trailing Lancaster and he may have believed they were the van of John's entire army, as on the 10th the English made another long march of 32 miles (51 km) to Thury-Harcourt and on the 11th an exceptionally long march of 40 miles (64 km) to Saint-Fromond on the Vire, where he avoided a French ambush.

The force returned to Montebourg on 13 July. In 22 days the English had travelled 330 miles (530 km), a remarkable effort for the period. The three-week expedition had been very successful: two of the besieged towns had been resupplied, the participants had seized a large amount of loot, including many horses, damage had been done to the French economy and prestige, the alliance with the Norman nobles had been cemented, there had been few casualties and the French King had been distracted from the Black Prince's preparations for a greater chevauchée in south-west France.

== Aftermath ==
Philip of Navarre and Godfrey d'Harcourt (a prominent and influential Norman noble) acknowledged Edward III as King of France and did homage to him for their Norman lands. Lancaster moved on to Brittany with 2,500 men. From there he marched south in mid-August, intending to link up with a march north by the Black Prince in the vicinity of Tours. He was unable to cross the Loire and returned to Brittany where he laid siege to its capital, Rennes.

When King John received news that the Black Prince had commenced a chevauchée of his own with an Anglo-Gascon force moving north from Bergerac, he offered the garrison of Breteuil easy terms to end the siege. He then assembled a royal army at Chartres, pursued the Anglo-Gascons, cut off their retreat and forced them to battle at Poitiers. The French army was heavily defeated by the smaller Anglo-Gascon force and John was captured, along with most of his court and much of the nobility of France.

== Notes, citations and sources ==
=== Sources ===
- Burne, Alfred (1999) [1955]. The Crecy War. Ware, Hertfordshire: Wordsworth Editions. ISBN 978-1-84022-210-4.
- Curry, Anne (2002). The Hundred Years' War 1337–1453. Oxford: Osprey Publishing. ISBN 978-1-84176-269-2.
- Fowler, Kenneth (1969). The King's Lieutenant: Henry of Grosmont, First Duke of Lancaster, 1310–1361. New York: Barnes & Noble. ISBN 978-0-389-01003-6.
- Harari, Yuval N. (2007). "For a Sack-full of Gold Écus: Calais 1350". Special Operations in the Age of Chivalry, 1100–1550. Woodbridge, Suffolk: Boydell Press. pp. 109–124. ISBN 978-1-84383-292-8.
- Hyland, Ann (1994). The Medieval Warhorse: from Byzantium to the Crusades. Dover: Alan Sutton Publishing. ISBN 978-0-86299-983-4.
- Jaques, Tony (2007). Dictionary of Battles and Sieges. Westport, Connecticut: Greenwood Publishing Group. ISBN 978-0-313-33537-2.
- Madden, Mollie Marie (2014). The Black Prince at War: The Anatomy of a Chevauchée (PDF) (PhD thesis). Minnesota: University of Minnesota.
- Prestwich, Michael (2007). Plantagenet England 1225–1360. Oxford: Oxford University Press. ISBN 978-0-19-922687-0.
- Rogers, Clifford J. (2004). Bachrach, Bernard S.; DeVries, Kelly & Rogers, Clifford J (eds.). "The Bergerac Campaign (1345) and the Generalship of Henry of Lancaster". Journal of Medieval Military History. Vol. II. Woodbridge, Suffolk: Boydell & Brewer. ISBN 978-1-84383-040-5. ISSN 0961-7582.
- Rogers, Clifford J. (1994). "Edward III and the Dialectics of Strategy, 1327-1360". Transactions of the Royal Historical Society. 4: 83–102. doi:10.2307/3679216. JSTOR 3679216. OCLC 931311378. S2CID 163041276.
- Rogers, Clifford J. (2014) [2000]. War Cruel and Sharp: English Strategy under Edward III, 1327–1360. Woodbridge, Suffolk: Boydell Press. ISBN 978-0-85115-804-4.
- Sumption, Jonathan (1990). Trial by Battle. The Hundred Years' War. Vol. I. London: Faber and Faber. ISBN 978-0-571-20095-5.
- Sumption, Jonathan (1999). Trial by Fire. The Hundred Years' War. Vol. II. London: Faber and Faber. ISBN 978-0-571-13896-8.
- Wagner, John A. (2006a). "Calais, Truce of (1347)". Encyclopedia of the Hundred Years War. Woodbridge, Suffolk: Greenwood. pp. 74–75. ISBN 978-0-313-32736-0.
- Wagner, John A. (2006b). "Charles the Bad, King of Navarre (1332–1387)". Encyclopedia of the Hundred Years War. Woodbridge, Suffolk: Greenwood. pp. 93–94. ISBN 978-0-313-32736-0.
- Wagner, John A. (2006c). "Guines, Treaty of". Encyclopedia of the Hundred Years War. Woodbridge, Suffolk: Greenwood. pp. 142–143. ISBN 978-0-313-32736-0.
- Wagner, John A. (2006d). "Poitiers, Battle of". Encyclopedia of the Hundred Years War. Woodbridge, Suffolk: Greenwood. pp. 256–258. ISBN 978-0-313-32736-0.
