= Lancaster's campaign =

Lancaster's campaign may refer to:

- Gascon campaign of 1345, an English offensive led by Henry, Duke of Lancaster, in Gascony during the Hundred Years' War
- Lancaster's chevauchée of 1346, an English offensive led by Henry, Duke of Lancaster, in southwest France during the Hundred Years' War
- Lancaster's Normandy chevauchée of 1356, an English offensive led by Henry, Duke of Lancaster, in Normandy during the Hundred Years' War
- Lancaster's Loire campaign of 1356, an English offensive led by Henry, Duke of Lancaster, in northwest France during the Hundred Years' War
