= Chevauchée of the Black Prince =

Chevauchée of the Black Prince may refer to:

- Black Prince's chevauchée of 1355
- Black Prince's chevauchée of 1356
