= Ransom of John II of France =

Ransom for the capture of John II of France

The ransom of John II of France was an event during the Hundred Years War, between France and England. King John II of France was captured by the English forces led by Edward, the Black Prince during the Battle of Poitiers in 1356, and held for ransom by the English crown. Finally settled in the Treaty of Brétigny in 1360, the ransom of John II had serious consequences for the ongoing degradation of the stability of France and helped increase English influence during the war.

== Background ==
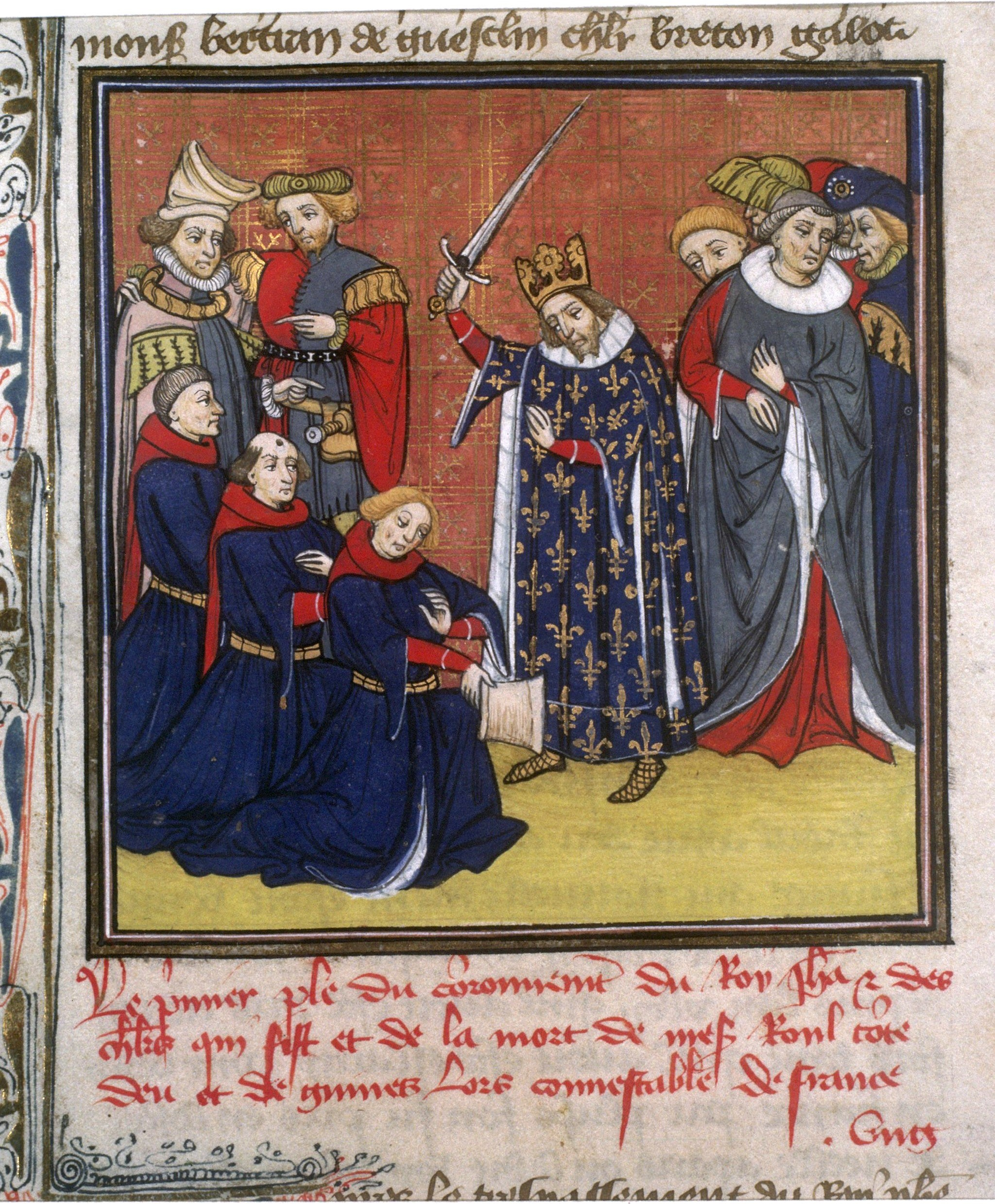
John II ennobling his knights.

From his ascent to the throne in 1350 to the time of his capture in 1356, King John II's reign had been marked by tensions both within and outside of his kingdom. John's Valois claim on French territories was disputed by both King Charles II of Navarre and King Edward III of England. Vital provinces such as Normandy maintained a high level of autonomy from the crown and frequently threatened to disintegrate into private wars. Worse, many nobles had closer links to the English crown than to Paris. The Hundred Years' War that had begun nineteen years before was not a modern war of nations; as one scholar has put it, it was 'an intermittent struggle... a coalition war, with the English often supported by Burgundians and Gascons, and even a civil war, whose combatants looked back to a heritage that was partly shared.'

The French defeat at Crécy in 1346 under John's father, Philip VI of France, and the loss of Calais in 1347 had increased the pressures on the Valois family to achieve military success. John himself was an unlikely candidate for a warrior prince; his health was fragile and he engaged little in physical activity, seldom jousting or hunting. His interests ran more towards literature, and to the patronage of painters and musicians. Perhaps in response to his lack of martial prowess, John had created the Order of the Star. As with Edward III's creation of the Order of the Garter, John hoped to play on the concepts of knightly chivalry to bolster his prestige and authority. Having grown up amongst intrigue and treason, John governed in a secretive manner. His reliance upon a close circle of trusted advisers frequently alienated his nobles, who objected to what they perceived as arbitrary justice and the elevation of unworthy associates, such as Constable Charles de la Cerda. The issues of friction within the French nobility, weaknesses in personal administration and chivalric ideals would play out in the ransom of King John II.

== Capture ==
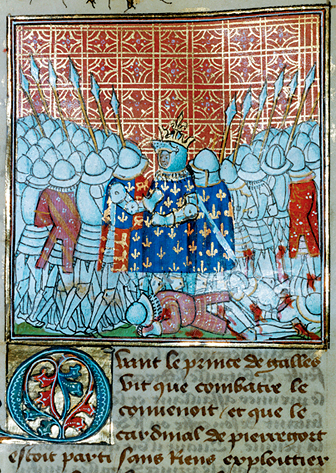
John II being captured by the English.

After straining financial trouble for both kingdoms and incidence of the Black Death, the war resumed in 1355 after an eight-year break. Despite John II's efforts to offer peace by offering continental French land, Edward III knew that peace was impossible to keep. In September, 1355, Edward, The Black Prince, led an English-Gascon army in a violent raid, termed a chevauchée, across southwestern France. After checking an English incursion into Normandy, John led an army of about 16,000 south, crossing the Loire in September, 1356, attempting to outflank the English soldiers at Poitiers numbering less than 7,000. The Prince's situation was poor; his forces were now trapped, outnumbered and weak from illness. John was confident of victory and, rejecting both the Prince's efforts to negotiate a solution, insisting on the Prince's surrender as a hostage, and advice from Marshal Jean de Clermont to surround and starve the Black Prince, the King ordered a direct attack. In an era in which chivalry placed high importance on winning renown through personal feats of arms, or 'prowess', and in which victory was a sign of God's favour, the prospect of a decisive battle must have been politically appealing to the troubled King.

The Battle of Poitiers was a disaster for the French as a result of superior defensive position and strategy allowing the use of English longbows effectively. As at the Battle of Agincourt sixty years later, many French forces did not fully participate. Prominently, Dauphin Charles, his younger brother Louis, Count of Anjou and Philip, Duke of Orléans left the battle early, possibly as a result of an order from John. At least their departure meant that they avoided capture by the English; King John was less fortunate. John had taken precautions against his own capture; he was guarded in the battle by the ninety members of the Order of the Star, and had nineteen knights from his personal guard dressed identically to confuse the enemy. Surrounded and with most of the Order's members dead, the King fought on with considerable personal valour until Denis de Morbecque, a French exile who fought for England, approached him.

"Sire," Morbecque is said to have announced, "I am a knight of Artois. Yield yourself to me and I will lead you to the Prince of Wales."

King John II is said to have surrendered by handing him his glove. That night King John dined in the red silk tent of his enemy, where the Black Prince attended to him personally. He was then taken to Bordeaux, and ultimately from there to England, where he was at first held in the Savoy Palace, London, then at a variety of locations, including Windsor, Hertford, Somerton Castle in Lincolnshire, Berkhamsted Castle in Hertfordshire and briefly at King John's Lodge in East Sussex. Eventually, John was taken to the Tower of London. As a prisoner of the English for several years, John was granted royal privileges, permitting him to travel about and to enjoy a regal lifestyle. His account books during his captivity show that he was purchasing horses, pets, and clothes while maintaining an astrologer and a court band. Philip, John's fourth son, fought besides him and had also been captured at Poitiers and followed him into captivity.

== Ransom ==
Now in English captivity, King John began the challenging task of negotiating a peace treaty, which would likely require the payment of a large ransom and territorial concessions. Meanwhile, in Paris, the Dauphin, Prince Charles, was facing his own difficulties in his new position as regent. Charles had returned to Paris with his honour intact, but popular feelings over a second French military disaster were running high. Charles summoned the Estates General in October to seek money for the defense of the country. But many of those assembled, furious at what they saw as poor and secretive management under King John, formed an opposition group body led by Etienne Marcel, the Provost of Merchants. Marcel demanded widespread political concessions. Charles refused the demands, dismissed the Estates-General, and left Paris.

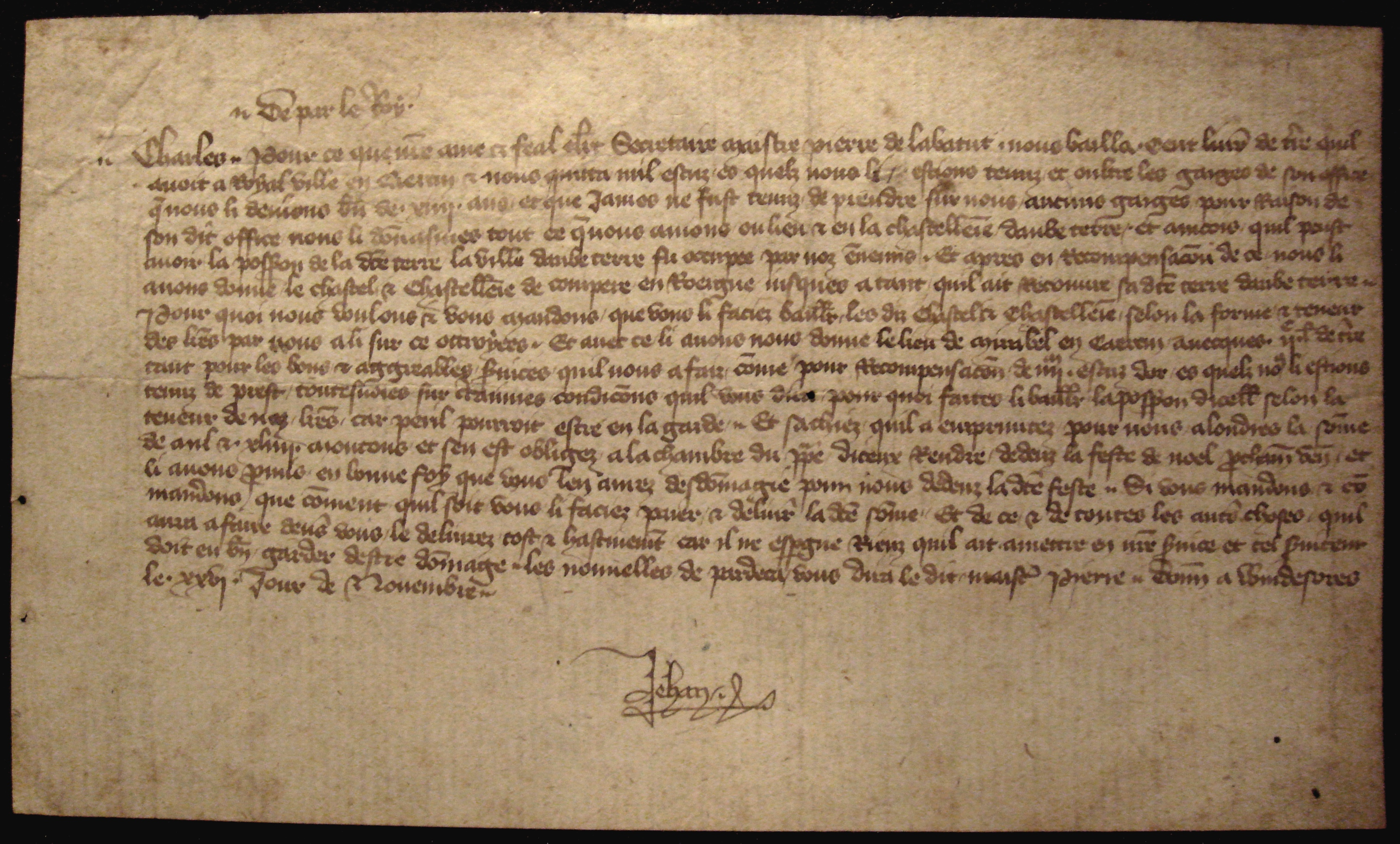
King John II writing a letter during his captivity in Windsor, to his son Charles.

Political strife ensued. In an attempt to raise money, Charles tried to devalue the currency; Marcel ordered strikes, and the Dauphin was forced to cancel his plans and recall the Estates in February 1357. The Third Estate (the commoners), with support from many nobles, presented the Dauphin with a Grand Ordinance, a list of 61 articles that would have severely restricted royal powers. Under pressure from the mob, Charles eventually signed the ordinance as Regent. But when news of the document reached King John II, still at this point imprisoned in Bordeaux, he immediately repudiated the ordinance. During the summer, Charles began to enlist support from the provinces against Marcel and the Parisian mob, and successfully re-entering Paris. The final act of violence was the murder by the mob of key royal officials. Charles again fled the capital, but the attack broke the temporary alliance between the Parisian commons and the nobility. By August 1358, Marcel was assassinated and Charles was, once more, able to return to Paris.

At the influence of the Pope, a truce was called in March 1357 and negotiations were opened for King John's release. Once in London, King John signed the Treaty of London (1358), which set his ransom at 4 million écus. After the French could not raise the first installment of ransom, this treaty was replaced with the Treaty of London (1359), which additionally ceded most of western France to England. The Estates General rejected this second treaty, and King Edward III reinvaded France later that year, landing in Calais in October 1359. Edward reached Reims in December and Paris in March, but his advances were unsuccessful in drawing out the French army to a decisive battle. King Edward reduced his terms to a third of western France (mostly in Aquitaine and Gascony), and a ransom of 3 million crowns, which was agreed to in the Treaty of Brétigny (1360).

== John's return ==
Prince Louis, Count of Anjou

The Treaty of Brétigny, signed on 25 May 1360, offered the release of John in exchange for 83 hostages, along with other payments. After four years in captivity, King John II was released after the signing of the treaty. John's son, Prince Louis, Count of Anjou, who had avoided capture at Poitiers, was among the persons who were to be given as hostages. In October 1360, Louis sailed to England from Calais. The full ransom was to be paid within six months, but France was economically weakened and incapable of paying the ransom on schedule. After several years in captivity, Louis tried to privately negotiate with King Edward III of England for his freedom. When this failed, Louis decided to escape; he arrived back in France in July 1363.

King John II had returned to a difficult situation in 1360. France was still divided, had lost considerable territories, and was heavily indebted to England. The Dauphin's infant daughters, Joan and Bonne, died within two weeks of each other. Charles himself had been severely ill, with his hair and nails falling out; based upon the symptoms, some suggest that he had arsenic poisoning. Most of his inner circle had died at the Battle of Poitiers.

The royal administration continued to perform poorly. When John was informed that Louis had escaped, he voluntarily returned to captivity in England. John's council tried to dissuade him from doing so, but he persisted, citing "good faith and honor." He sailed to England that winter, where he was met by Sir Alan Buxhull, Sir Richard Pembridge and Lord Burghersh at Dover, to be conducted to Eltham and the Savoy Palace and was warmly welcomed in London in January 1364. However, John became ill and died in April 1364. His body was returned to France, where he was interred in the royal chambers at Saint-Denis Basilica.

It is not certain why John returned to captivity, even though chivalry was perhaps at its height at that time. Acts of mercy and clemency were looked upon positively in medieval times, but behaviour that violated the chivalric code was usually forgotten if it was clearly in the interests of the state. Escaping from captivity was unchivalrous, and carried consequences, but was still common nonetheless. John ii's critics alleged that he returned to London for "causa joci" (reasons of pleasure), citing his unmartial lifestyle. Historians have speculated that John simply could not face the difficulties of ruling France. John may have seen his failures and Charles' misfortunes as a sign from God, and consequently sought religious redemption. John may also have hoped to negotiate with Edward III directly.

Over time, the ransom of King John had a considerable impact. The money paid to England contributed to the royal treasury until the reign of King Henry V. Although the short reign of King Charles V from 1364 to 1380 was successful, the political unrest that ensued after the capture of King John II fed into the instability of King Charles VI's reign, weakening France severely throughout much of the Hundred Years War.
