= Black Prince's chevauchée of 1356 =

English raid of the Hundred Years' War

Chevauchée of the Black Prince
- Part of the Hundred Years' War
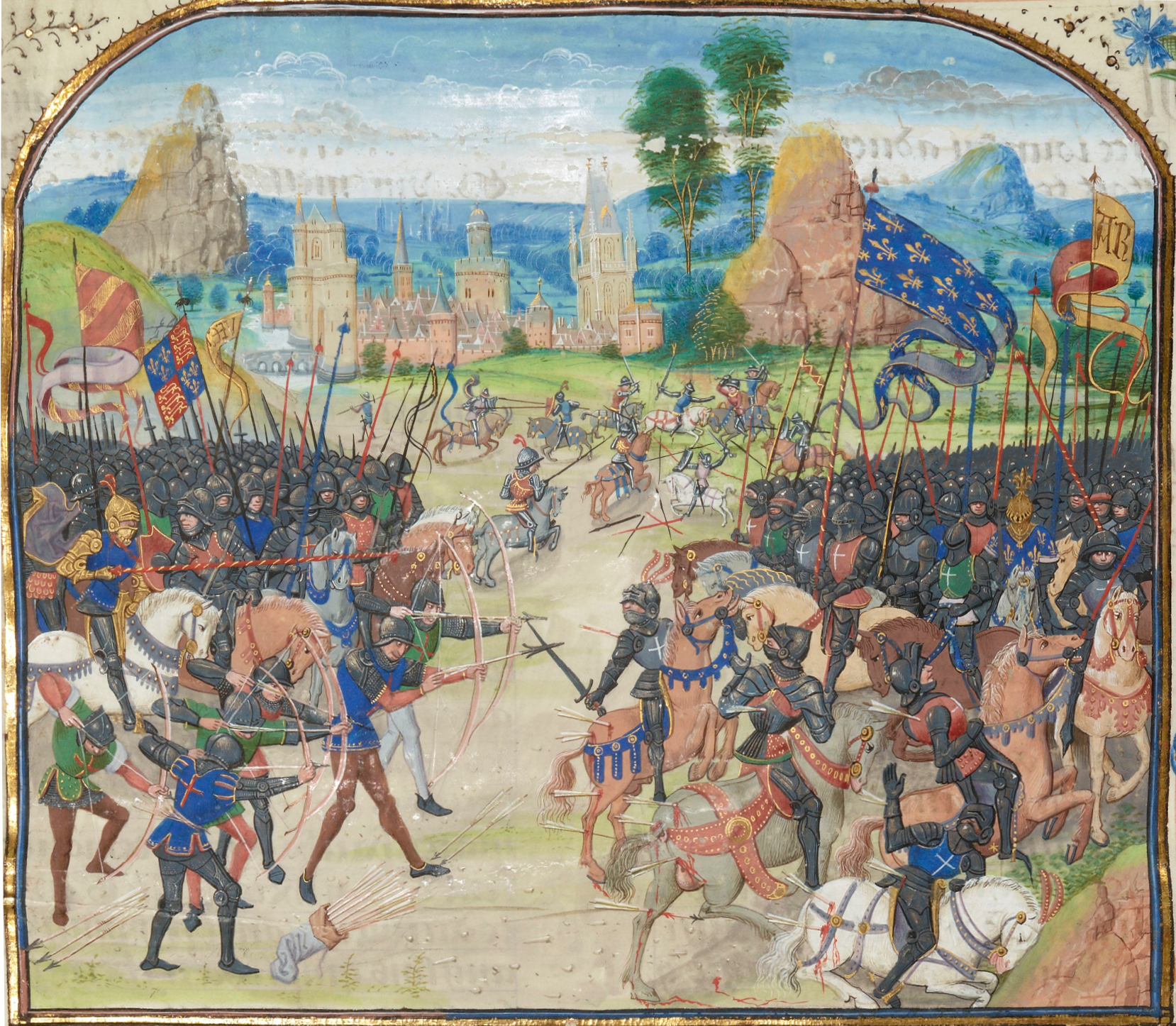
- Near-contemporary image of the Battle of Poitiers
Date	4 August – 2 October 1356
Location	South-west France
Result	Anglo-Gascon victory

Belligerents
Kingdom of England	Kingdom of France

Commanders and leaders
Edward, the Black Prince	John II (POW)

Strength
6,000	Unknown but large

Casualties and losses
Few	Heavy

An Anglo-Gascon force under Edward, the Black Prince, conducted a large-scale chevauchée (mounted raid) between 4 August and 2 October 1356 as a part of the Hundred Years' War. The war had broken out in 1337, but a truce and the ravages of the Black Death had restricted the extent of the fighting since 1347. By 1355 the French king, John II, was determined to resume full-scale war. That autumn, while Edward III of England threatened northern France, his son, Edward of Woodstock, later known as the Black Prince, carried out a devastating mounted raid, or chevauchée: an Anglo-Gascon army marched from the English possession of Gascony 675 miles (1,086 km) to Narbonne and back. The French refused battle, despite suffering enormous economic damage.

In 1356 the Black Prince intended to carry out a similar chevauchée, this time as part of a larger strategic operation intended to strike the French from several directions simultaneously. On 4 August 6,000 Anglo-Gascon soldiers headed north from Bergerac towards Bourges, devastating a wide swathe of French territory and sacking many French towns on the way. They hoped to join up with two English forces in the vicinity of the River Loire, but by early September the Anglo-Gascons were facing the much larger French royal army on their own. The Black Prince withdrew towards Gascony; he was prepared to give battle, but only if he could fight on the tactical defensive on ground of his own choosing. John was determined to fight, preferably by cutting the Anglo-Gascons off from their sources of supply and forcing them to attack him in his prepared position. In the end, the French succeeded in cutting off the Prince's army, but then decided to attack it in its prepared defensive position anyway, partly from fear it might slip away, but mostly as a question of honour. This led to the Battle of Poitiers on 19 September.

Between 14,000 and 16,000 French troops, including at least 10,000 men-at-arms, (Note: Men-at-arms were, broadly, knights or knights in training. They were drawn from the landed gentry and ranged from great lords to the relatives and attendants of minor landowners. They needed to be able to equip themselves with a full suit of plate armour and a war horse.) attacked on the morning of 19 September in four separate waves. The Anglo-Gascons defeated each in turn during a long-drawn-out battle. They partially surrounded the final French attack and captured the French King and one of his sons. In total 5,800 Frenchmen were killed and 2,000 to 3,000 men-at-arms captured. The surviving French dispersed while the Anglo-Gascons continued their withdrawal to Gascony. The following spring a two-year truce was agreed and the Black Prince escorted John to London. Negotiations to end the war and ransom John dragged out and Edward launched a further campaign in 1359. During this, both sides compromised and the Treaty of Brétigny was agreed, by which vast areas of France were ceded to England, to be personally ruled by the Black Prince, and John was ransomed for three million gold écu. At the time this seemed to end the war, but the French initiated a resumption of hostilities in 1369 and recaptured most of the territory lost. The war did not end until 1453, with a French victory.

== Background ==
Since the Norman Conquest of 1066, English monarchs had held titles and lands within France, the possession of which made them vassals of the kings of France. Following a series of disagreements between Philip VI of France (r. 1328–1350) and Edward III of England (r. 1327–1377), on 24 May 1337 Philip's Great Council in Paris agreed that the lands held by Edward III in France should be taken back into Philip's hands on the grounds that Edward III was in breach of his obligations as a vassal. This marked the start of the Hundred Years' War, which was to last 116 years.

France in 1330. Gascony alone, with some smaller territories, remained under the English crown.

The only important French possession still held by the English in France was Gascony in the south west. But Gascony was disproportionately important: duty levied by the English Crown on wine from Gascony was more than all other English customs duties combined and by far the largest source of state income. Bordeaux, the capital of Gascony, had a population of more than 50,000, greater than London's, and Bordeaux was possibly richer. Although Gascony was the cause of the war, Edward III was able to spare few resources for its defence. In most campaigning seasons the Gascons had to rely on their own resources and were hard-pressed by the French. Typically the Gascons could field 3,000–6,000 men, the large majority infantry, although up to two-thirds of them would be tied down in garrisoning their fortifications. In 1345 and 1346 Henry, Earl of Lancaster, led a series of successful campaigns in Aquitaine and the combined English and Gascon forces, or Anglo-Gascons, were able to push the focus of the fighting away from the heart of Gascony.

The French port of Calais fell to the English in August 1347 after the Crécy campaign and shortly afterward the Truce of Calais was signed. This was partially the result of both countries being financially exhausted. The same year the Black Death reached northern France and southern England killing a high proportion of the population of Western Europe, and with an even higher death rate in England. This catastrophe, which lasted until 1350, temporarily halted the fighting. The treaty was extended repeatedly over the years; this did not stop ongoing naval clashes, nor small-scale fighting – which was especially fierce in south-west France – nor occasional fighting on a larger scale.

A treaty ending the war was negotiated at Guînes and signed on 6 April 1354. However, the French king, now John II (r. 1350–1364), decided not to ratify it and it did not take effect. It was clear that from the summer of 1355 both sides would be committed to full-scale war. In April 1355 Edward and his council, with the treasury in an unusually favourable financial position, decided to launch offensives that year in both northern France and Gascony. John attempted to strongly garrison his northern towns and fortifications against the expected descent by Edward III, at the same time as assembling a field army; he was unable to, largely because of lack of money.

=== Black Prince arrives ===
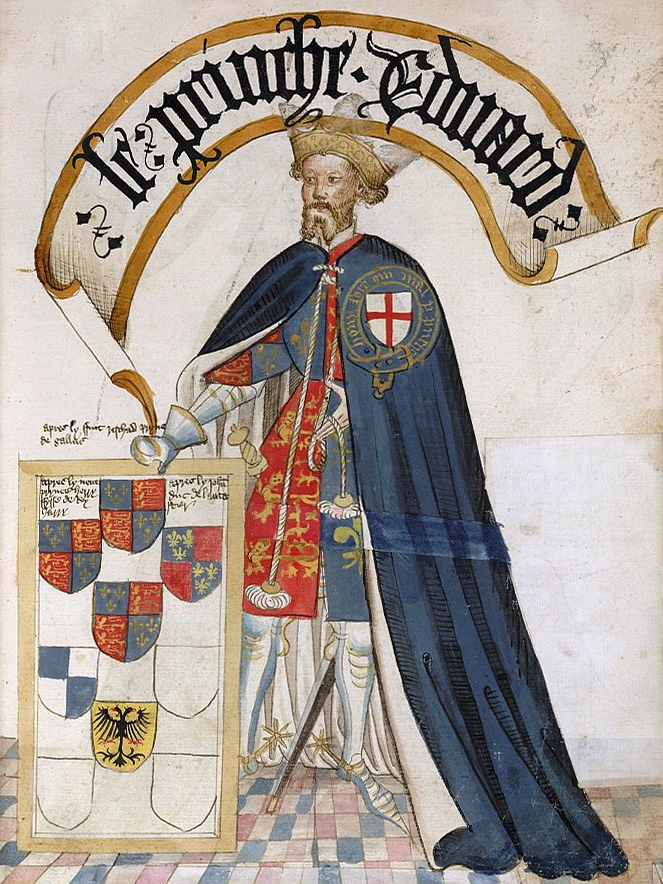
Edward, the Black Prince

Edward's eldest son, Edward of Woodstock, later commonly known as the Black Prince, was given the Gascon command and began assembling men, shipping and supplies. He arrived in Bordeaux on 20 September 1355 accompanied by 2,200 English soldiers. The next day he was formally acknowledged as the king's lieutenant in Gascony, with plenipotentiary powers. Gascon nobles reinforced him to a strength of somewhere between 5,000 and 6,000 and provided a bridging train (Note: A bridging train is an assemblage of bridge-making equipment which is mobile and which can be rapidly assembled to bridge rivers.) and a substantial supply train.

Edward set out on 5 October on a chevauchée, which was a large-scale mounted raid. The Anglo-Gascon force marched from Bordeaux in English-held Gascony 300 miles (500 km) to Narbonne and back to Gascony, devastating a wide swathe of French territory and sacking many French towns on the way. John, Count of Armagnac, who commanded the local French forces, avoided battle, and there was little fighting. While no territory was captured, enormous economic damage was done to France; the modern historian Clifford Rogers concluded "the importance of the economic attrition of the chevauchée can hardly be exaggerated." The expedition returned to Gascony on 2 December having marched 675 miles (1,100 km).

The English component resumed the offensive after Christmas to great effect, and more than 50 French-held towns or fortifications were captured during the following four months, including strategically important towns close to the borders of Gascony, and others more than 80 miles (130 km) away. Local French commanders attempted no countermeasures. Several members of the local French nobility went over to the English; the Black Prince received homage from them on 24 April 1356.

Money and enthusiasm for the war were running out in France. The modern historian Jonathan Sumption describes the French national administration as "fall[ing] apart in jealous acrimony and recrimination". A contemporary chronicler recorded "the King of France was severely hated in his own realm". Arras rebelled and killed loyalists. The major nobles of Normandy refused to pay taxes. On 5 April 1356 John arrested the notoriously treacherous Charles II, king of Navarre, one of the largest landholders in France (Note: Known as "Charles the Bad", he had repeatedly plotted with the English and in 1354 had murdered the constable of France, one of John's closest advisers, in his bedroom and boasted of it.) and another nine of his more outspoken critics; four were summarily executed. Several Norman nobles turned to Edward for assistance.

Seeing an opportunity, Edward diverted an expedition planned for Brittany under Lancaster to Normandy in late June. Lancaster set off with 2,300 men and pillaged and burnt his way eastward across Normandy from the Cotentin. King John moved to Rouen with a much stronger force, hoping to intercept Lancaster. After relieving and re-victualling two besieged fortifications the English stormed and sacked the important town of Verneuil. John pursued, but bungled several opportunities to bring the English to battle and they escaped. In only three weeks' time, the expedition had seized a large amount of loot, including many horses, damage had been done to the French economy and prestige, and new alliances had been cemented, and all this with few casualties. Furthermore, the French King had been distracted from the English preparations for a greater chevauchée from south-west France.

== Prelude ==
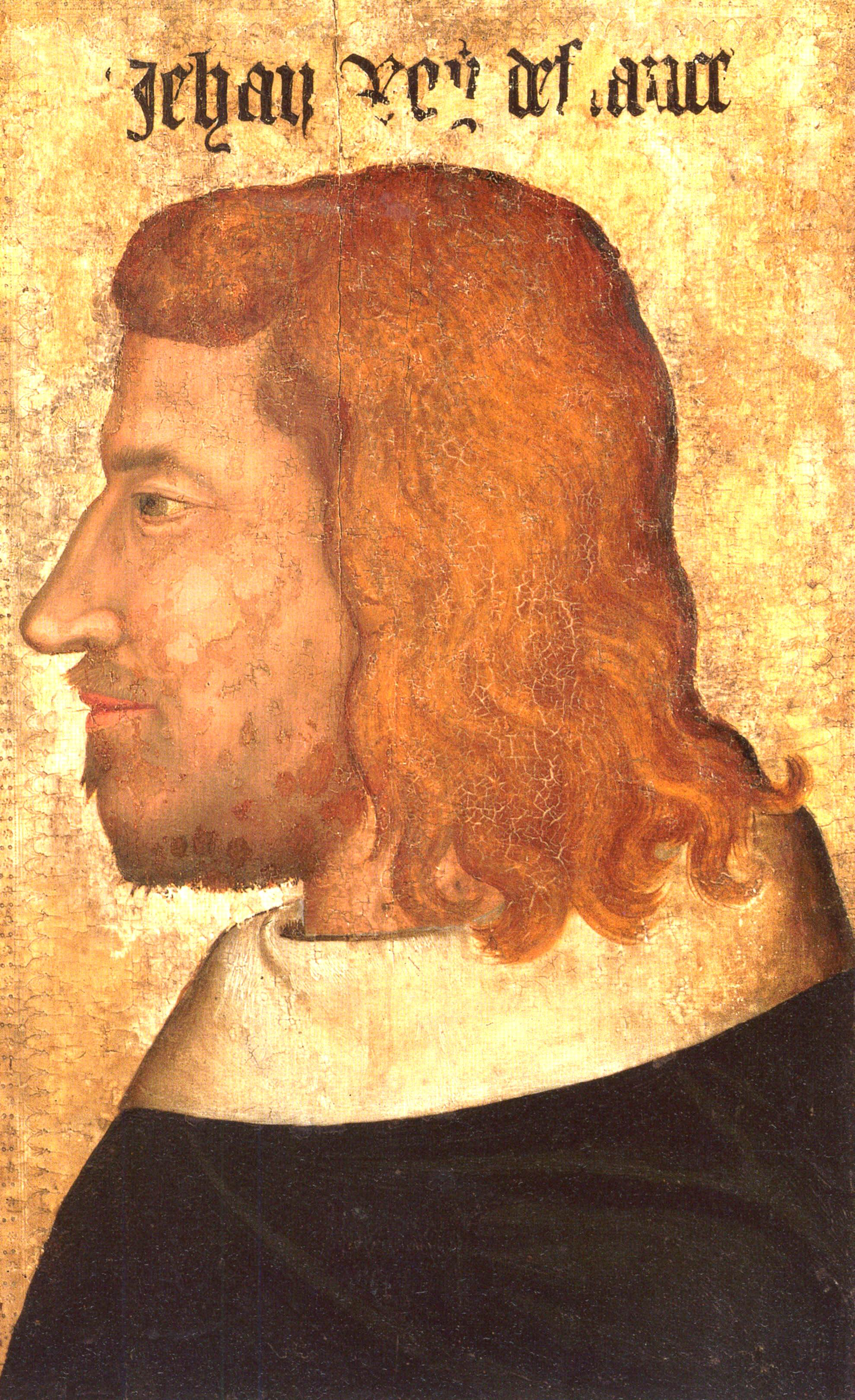
Contemporary image of John II

The French announced an arrière-ban, a formal call to arms for all able-bodied males, on 14 May. The response was unenthusiastic and the call was repeated in late May and again in early June. The French were so short of cash they were unable to pay wages to those men who did muster. The French army had inherent weaknesses: it consisted of thousands of very small contingents; unaccustomed to cooperating with each other; unknown to their commanders; and of variable health, training and equipment. John's fifteen-year-old son John, Count of Poitiers, was given command of an army in Languedoc, to guard against the Black Prince repeating the previous year's exploits.

The Black Prince received reinforcements of men. Edward is known to have ordered 600 additional longbowmen to be raised in England specifically for Gascony. Horses, food and materiel also arrived during the spring. (Note: Records of the details of some of the items shipped survive. For example, more than 57,000 bowstrings were ordered.) Ralph, Earl of Stafford, arrived in mid-June 1356 with further reinforcements and supplies, and bearing orders from Edward. The Black Prince called a grand assembly of the Gascon nobility and representatives of the towns, made a show of seeking their advice and when it appeared there was a consensus for war asked for funds with which to prosecute it. In the glow of his recent successes he was granted a tax of one-fifteenth of all of Gascony's movable goods. (Note: The campaign and the battle which followed it were so lucrative the rationale for the tax was removed within months of it being agreed and it was never collected.) He thanked the assembly and made a stirring speech encouraging a large turnout for the forthcoming campaign.

The gathering point for the Anglo-Gascon army was Bergerac; the town had good river supply links to Bordeaux and from there the Prince could strike in several directions. The hope was that this would cause the French to divide their forces in an attempt to cover all avenues of attack. In fact there was already a broad plan: three English armies would rendezvous somewhere on the Loire. Edward would march south west from Calais, Lancaster would strike south from Brittany and the Black Prince would move north from Bergerac.

In Normandy John committed his army to re-establishing the siege of Breteuil on 12 July; Breteuil was the last fortification holding out against him in eastern Normandy. The royal army attracted great contemporary praise for its splendour and the high status of many of its participants. However, it made little progress, as Breteuil was well garrisoned and had been resupplied by Lancaster with food for a year. John attempted to mine under the walls, to no avail.

== Chevauchée ==
=== Heading north ===
Map showing the routes of the Anglo-Gascon and French armies

So many Gascons arrived at Bergerac that there was concern the province would not be adequately defended if the French were to counter-attack. So 2,000–3,000 men were detached to remain, under the Seneschal of Gascony, John de Cheverston. The force which set out contained some 6,000 fighting men: 3,000 English and Gascon men-at-arms; 2,000 archers, almost entirely English and Welsh longbowmen; and 1,000 other infantry, predominately Gascons. They were accompanied by approximately 4,000 non-combatants. All the fighting men were mounted, including those who would fight on foot, such as the archers. On 4 August 1356 they headed north. On the 6th they reached Périgueux, which they looted. On 14 August the Anglo-Gascon army crossed the River Vienne, halting on the 15th at Lesterps to rest and repair equipment, having marched 113 miles (182 km) from Bergerac.

The Anglo-Gascon army then separated into three divisions, known as battles, which moved north abreast of each other and began to systematically devastate the countryside. There would be approximately 40 miles (64 km) between the flanking units, enabling them to devastate a band of French territory more than 50 miles (80 km) wide yet be able to unite to face an enemy at approximately a day's notice. They advanced slowly, to facilitate their tasks of looting and destruction. The modern historian David Green has described the progress of the Black Prince's army as "deliberately destructive, extremely brutal ... methodical and sophisticated." Several strong castles were assaulted and captured. The populaces of most towns fled, or surrendered at the first sight of Anglo-Gascon troops. Overall, there was little French resistance, and no field army to prevent the Prince's forces from dispersing widely to maximise their destructive effect on the French countryside.

The main French army remained in Normandy. Despite it being clear Breteuil could be neither stormed nor starved, John felt unable to abandon its siege as this would undermine his prestige as a warrior-king. He declined to march against the Black Prince, declaring the garrison of Breteuil posed a more serious threat. At some point in August an unusually large belfry, or mobile siege tower, was pushed up to the walls of Breteuil and a large assault launched. The defenders set fire to the belfry and repulsed the attack. Sumption describes the French losses in this attack as "terrible" and the entire second siege as "a pointless endeavour". The historian Kenneth Fowler describes the siege as "magnificent but archaic". Eventually John had to give way to the pressure to do something to prevent the destruction being wrought in south-west France. Some time around 20 August he offered the garrison of Breteuil free passage to the Cotentin, a huge bribe, and permission to take their valuables and goods, which persuaded them to vacate the town. The French army promptly marched south, as all available forces were concentrated against the Black Prince.

The Anglo-Gascons had been advancing in the general direction of Bourges, a large and well-fortified town where the Count of Poitiers had moved his army from Languedoc and was rallying regional French forces. Poitiers retreated as the Anglo-Gascons advanced on Bourges, and a division of the Black Prince's army tried and failed to take the town, then burnt the suburbs and continued north. (Note: This was not the division commanded by the Black Prince, but probably the one commanded by John Chandos and James Audley.) This division reached Aubigny, 30 miles (48 km) to the north, by 28 August, and proceeded to loot and raze the town. Anglo-Gascon forces continued north, searching for a place where their army could cross the Loire. But it had been a wet summer, the river was flowing too fast and deep to be forded and the French had destroyed all bridges which they were not certain they could defend. Still on the 28th a large French scouting party was driven off near Aubigny with losses. From prisoners taken during this encounter the Black Prince learnt that the main French army was on the move and approaching Orléans and that John hoped to bring the Prince to battle near Tours.

=== Clashes along the Loire ===
Hearing that John was marching on Tours and was prepared to give battle, the Black Prince moved his three divisions closer together and ordered them to move towards Tours. He was willing to fight an open battle, if he could do so under the right circumstances. He still hoped to cross the Loire, both to be able to come to grips with the French army and to link up with either Edward's or Lancaster's armies, if they were in the area. On 29 August another party of French men-at-arms, led by Boucicaut, the newly appointed marshal of France, ambushed a small English force before being driven off by fresh English troops and pursued to the castle of Romorantin. The entire Anglo-Gascon army gathered here and assaulted the castle on the 30th. The outer walls were captured, but the French held out in the keep. A council of war decided to besiege it, both hoping to capture Boucicaut and anticipating a battle if John attempted to relieve the siege. But John was still gathering his forces at Orléans and Chartres and so the Anglo-Gascons were able to concentrate on attacking Romorantin, where the French surrendered on 3 September.

The French royal army from Breteuil had moved to Chartres, where it received reinforcements, particularly of men-at-arms. John sent home nearly all of the infantry contingents, leaving an entirely mounted force which had the mobility and speed to match that of the Black Prince's all-mounted army. Disbanding the large number of infantry units also reduced the French wage bill, and John was convinced the utility of many of the poorly trained and equipped militia was low. Nevertheless, he was criticised both at the time and later for the decision. Two hundred Scottish picked men-at-arms under William, Earl of Douglas, who was then Lord of Douglas and not yet an earl, joined John at Chartres. Once John felt he had an overwhelmingly strong force it set off south towards the Loire, and then south west along its north bank.

The Anglo-Gascons marched west from Romorantin along the valley of the Cher towards Tours. Scouts were sent north to search for passages of the Loire, but as before were unable to find passable fords or intact bridges not strongly fortified and garrisoned. The camp-fires of the French army were visible to the north. Early on 8 September the Black Prince's army reached Tours, where he received news that Lancaster was not far to the east, on the other side of the Loire, and hoped to join him soon. The Anglo-Gascons prepared for battle and expected the imminent arrival of the French. But John had crossed the Loire at Blois, to the east of Tours, on 10 September where he was joined by the army of the Count of Poitiers.

=== Other English offensives ===
Meanwhile the anticipated support from England failed to materialise. In early August an Aragonese galley fleet, which had sailed from Barcelona in April, arrived in the English Channel. Galleys were ships commonly used in the Mediterranean, which the French adopted for use in northern waters during summer months. Being shallow-draught vessels propelled by banks of oars the galleys could penetrate shallow harbours and were highly manoeuvrable, making them effective for raiding and ship-to-ship combat in meeting engagements. The fleet hired by the French only contained nine galleys, but it caused panic among the English. Edward's attempts to raise an army to send to France were still under way and shipping was being assembled. The troops gathered were split up to guard the coast and the ships sailing to Southampton to transport the army were ordered to remain in port until the galleys had left.

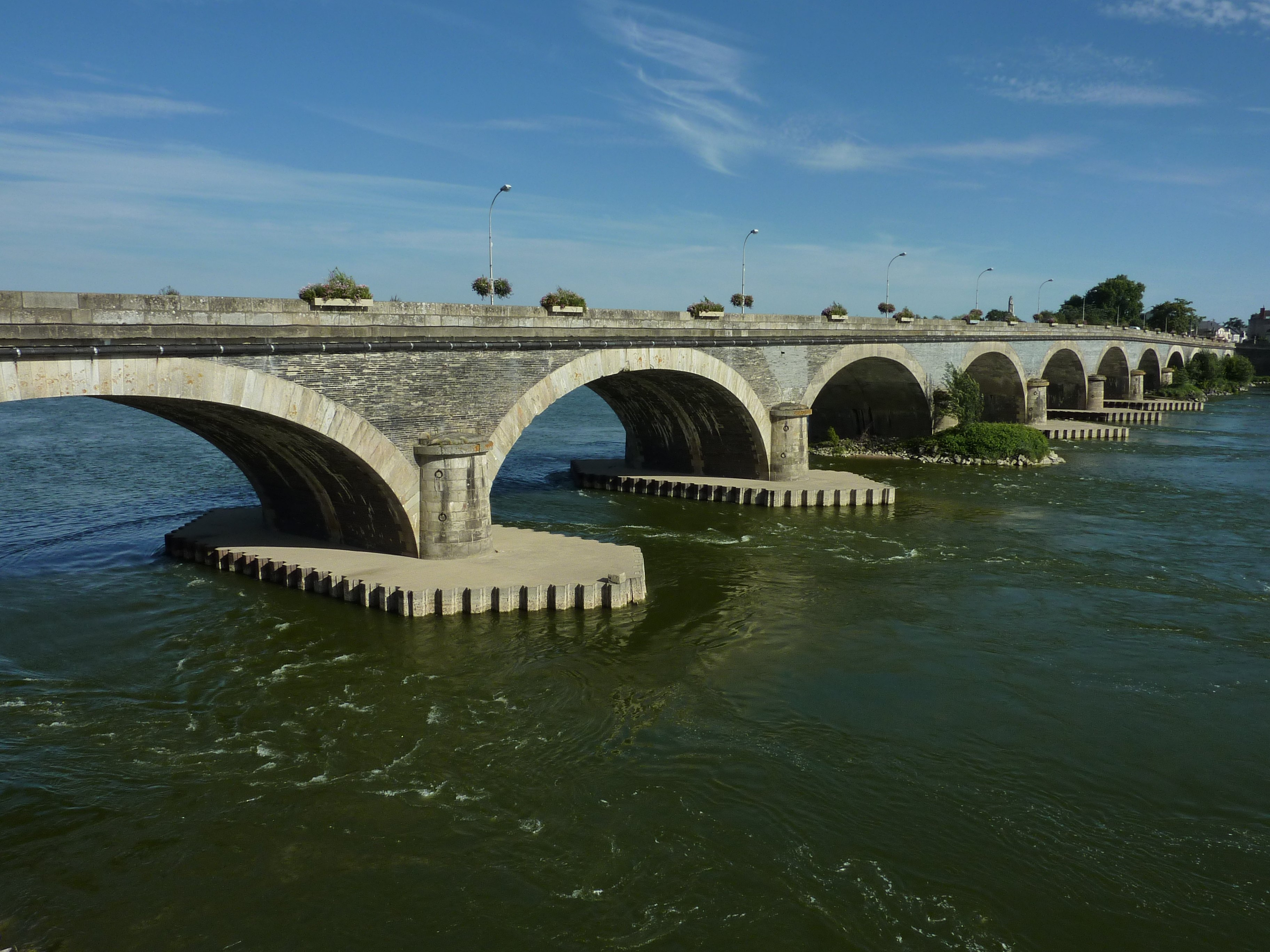
The 19th-century Dumnacus Bridge over the Loire at Les Ponts-de-Cé

At some point in August Lancaster marched south from eastern Brittany with an army of unknown size. He had brought with him from Normandy 2,500 men. He also had under his command more than 2,000 men garrisoning the English-held fortifications of Brittany. The extent to which he added the men from these garrisons to the troops he brought with him before marching to support the Black Prince is not known. As for the Black Prince, the unusual height of the river and the French control of the bridges, meant Lancaster was unable to cross and effect a junction. In early September he abandoned the attempt to force a crossing at Les Ponts-de-Cé and returned to Brittany. En route he captured and garrisoned many French strongpoints. Once back in Brittany he laid siege to its capital, Rennes.

=== Strategy ===
The Anglo-Gascon army was treading a balance. While there were no large French forces facing them they spread out to loot and despoil the land. Their primary objective was to use the threat of devastation to force, or perhaps persuade, the French army to attack them. The Anglo-Gascons were confident that fighting defensively on ground of their choosing they could defeat a numerically superior French force. In the event of the French being too numerous they were equally confident that they could avoid battle by manoeuvring. The French, aware of this approach, usually attempted to isolate English forces against a river or the sea, where the threat of starvation would force them to take the tactical offensive and attack the French in a prepared position. Once he crossed the Loire, John repeatedly attempted to interpose his army between the Anglo-Gascons and Gascony, so they would be forced to try and fight their way out. Meanwhile the Black Prince did not wish to rapidly retreat to the safety of Gascony, but to manoeuvre in the vicinity of the French army so as to persuade it to attack on unfavourable terms, without himself becoming cut off. He was aware John had been eager to fight Lancaster's force in Normandy in June and anticipated this enthusiasm for battle would continue.

=== Retreating south ===
Once he had crossed the Loire on 10 September and been reinforced John moved to cut off the Anglo-Gascon line of retreat. Hearing of this, and losing hope that Lancaster would be able to join him, the Black Prince moved his army some 8 miles (13 km) south to Montbazon where he took up a fresh defensive position on 12 September. The same day John's son and heir Charles, the Dauphin, entered Tours, having travelled from Normandy with 1,000 men-at-arms, and Hélie de Talleyrand-Périgord, Cardinal of Périgord arrived at the Black Prince's camp to attempt to negotiate a two-day truce on behalf of Pope Innocent VI. According to differing sources this was to be followed by peace negotiations or an arranged battle. Happy to do battle, but concerned that a two-day delay would leave his army with its back to the Loire in an area with few supplies, the Black Prince dismissed Talleyrand and marching hard crossed the River Creuse at La Haye on the 13th, 25 miles (40 km) to the south. John, aware he outnumbered the Anglo-Gascons, was eager to wipe them out in battle and so similarly ignored Talleyrand. The French army continued to march south parallel to the English, rather than moving directly towards them, with the aim of cutting their lines of retreat and supply. On the 14th the English marched 15 miles (24 km) south west to Châtellerault on the Vienne.

At Châtellerault the Black Prince felt there were no geographical barriers against which the French could pin his army and that he was occupying an advantageous defensive position. He arrived there on 14 September, the day Talleyrand had proposed for the two armies to engage in battle, and waited for the French to come to him. Two days later his scouts reported that John had bypassed his position and was about to cross the Vienne at Chauvigny. At this point the French had lost track of the Anglo-Gascon army and were unaware of its position, but were about to serendipitously position themselves 20 miles (32 km) south of the Anglo-Gascons and directly in their path back to friendly territory. The Black Prince saw an opportunity to attack the French while they were on the march, or possibly even while crossing the Vienne, and so set off at first light on the 17th to intercept them, leaving his baggage train behind to follow on as best it could.

When the Anglo-Gascon vanguard reached Chauvigny most of the French army had already crossed and marched on towards Poitiers. A force of 700 men-at-arms of the French rearguard was intercepted near Savigny-Lévescault. Contemporary accounts note they were not wearing helmets, suggesting they were completely unarmoured and not expecting battle. They were rapidly routed with 240 killed or captured, including 3 counts taken prisoner. Many Anglo-Gascons pursued the remaining, fleeing, French, although the Black Prince held back most of his army, not wishing to scatter it in the close vicinity of the enemy, and camped at Savigny-Lévescault. In response, John drew up his army outside Poitiers in battle order.

=== Battle of Poitiers ===
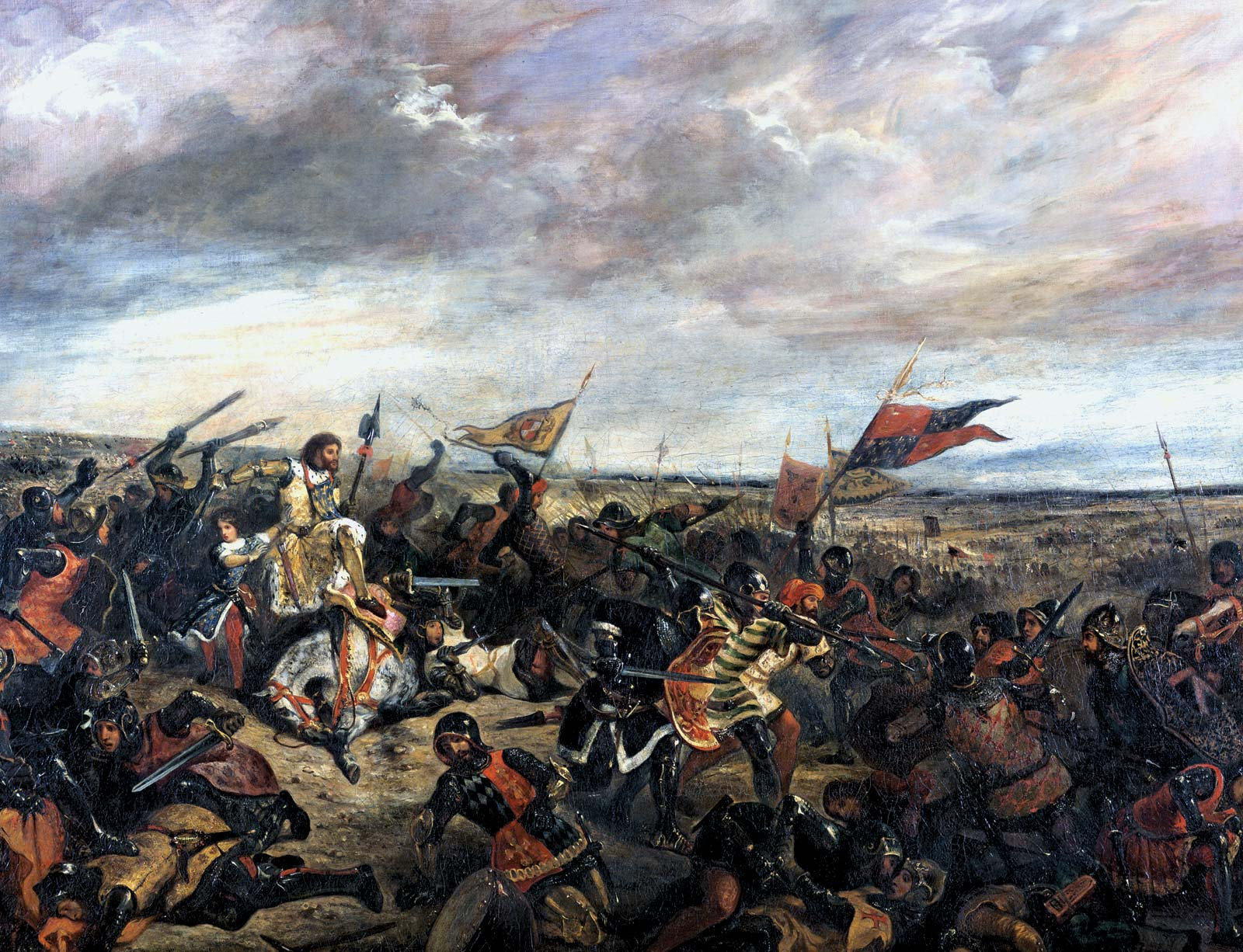
The Battle of Poitiers, by Eugène Delacroix

On 18 September the Anglo-Gascons marched towards Poitiers arrayed for battle, hoping the French would launch an impromptu assault. Instead Talleyrand rode up to negotiate. The Black Prince was initially disinclined to delay any battle. He was persuaded to discuss terms after Talleyrand pointed out that the two armies were now so close that if the French declined to attack, the Anglo-Gascons would find it almost impossible to withdraw. If they attempted to the French would attack, aiming to defeat them in detail, and if they stood their positions they would run out of supplies before the French. Unknown to Talleyrand the Anglo-Gascons were already unable to find sufficient water for their horses.

After lengthy negotiations the Black Prince agreed extensive concessions in exchange for free passage to Gascony. (Note: The Black Prince agreed to return all prisoners and territory taken over the past three years, refrain from fighting the French for seven years and pay 100,000 écu.) However, they were dependent on the agreement being ratified by his father, Edward III. Unknown to the French, Edward had given his son written permission to, in such circumstances, "help himself by making a truce or armistice, or in any other way that seems best to him." This has caused modern historians to doubt the Prince's sincerity. The French discussed these proposals at length, with John in favour, but several senior advisers felt it would be humiliating to, as they saw it, have at their mercy the Anglo-Gascon army which had devastated so much of France and to tamely allow it to escape. John was persuaded and Talleyrand informed the Black Prince that he could expect a battle. Attempts to agree a site for the battle failed, as the French wished the Anglo-Gascons to move out of their strong defensive position and the English wished to remain there. Early on 19 September Talleyrand again attempted to arrange a truce, but as his army's supplies were already running out the Black Prince rejected this.

The English army was arrayed in its three divisions, in line abreast, and a small reserve. The French army, of 14,000 to 16,000 men: 10,000–12,000 were men-at-arms, 2,000 were crossbowmen and 2,000 infantrymen who were not classed as men-at-arms. They were divided into four battles or divisions, of which the rearmost was held in reserve under the King. John ordered the raising of the French sacred standard, the oriflamme, indicating no prisoners were to be taken, on pain of death. One contemporary chronicler stated that John made a solitary exception, for the Black Prince. Initially neither side was prepared to advance across the broken ground between the armies, so the Black Prince, urgently needing to provoke a battle, manoeuvred his 6,000-strong army across the front of the French and persuaded them they could catch the Anglo-Gascons at a disadvantage.

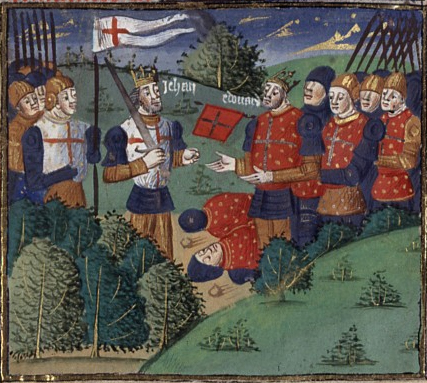
Capture of King John II of France at the Battle of Poitiers

Most of the French had dismounted and sent their horses to the rear, but some of the French vanguard who were mounted attacked, believing the movement signalled an Anglo-Gascon retreat. They were driven back, but were followed by the French vanguard, on foot. After a prolonged fight this was thrown back by the English. The second French division, consisting of 4,000 men-at-arms under Charles, the Dauphin, then attacked, all on foot. They were also repulsed by the now-confident Anglo-Gascons, but with even more difficulty than the vanguard. As the Dauphin's division recoiled there was confusion in the French ranks: about half the men of their third division, under Philip, the Duke of Orléans, left the field, taking with them many of the survivors of the first two attacks and all four of John's sons. (Note: One son, Philip, returned to his father's side, took part in the final attack and was captured.) Those Frenchmen remaining gathered around the King and launched a third attack against the by now exhausted Anglo-Gascons, again all as infantry.

Concerned his army would break and flee, the Black Prince ordered an advance. This bolstered Anglo-Gascon morale and shook the French. Some Anglo-Gascon men-at-arms mounted and charged the French on horseback. Battle was again joined, with the French slowly getting the better of it. Then a small force of 160 men, who had been sent earlier to threaten the French rear area, appeared behind the main French force. Believing themselves surrounded, some Frenchmen fled, which panicked others, and soon the entire French force collapsed. John was captured; as was the oriflamme; one of John's sons, Philip, and according to different sources 2,000 to 3,000 men-at-arms. Approximately 2,500 French men-at-arms were killed, as were approximately 3,300 common soldiers. Modern sources estimate Anglo-Gascon fatalities at about 40 men-at-arms and an uncertain but much larger number of bowmen and other infantry.

=== Post-battle ===
The French were concerned the victorious Anglo-Gascons would attempt to storm Poitiers or other towns, or continue their devastation. The Black Prince was more concerned with getting his army with its prisoners and loot safely back to Gascony. He was aware many Frenchmen had survived the battle, but unaware of their state of cohesion or morale. The Anglo-Gascons moved 3 miles (4.8 km) south on 20 September and tended the wounded, buried the dead, paroled some of their prisoners, and reorganised their formations. On 21 September the Anglo-Gascons continued their interrupted march south, travelling slowly, overladen as they were with loot, booty and prisoners. On 2 October they entered Libourne and rested while a triumphal entrance was arranged at Bordeaux. Two weeks later the Black Prince escorted John into Bordeaux amid ecstatic scenes.

== Aftermath ==
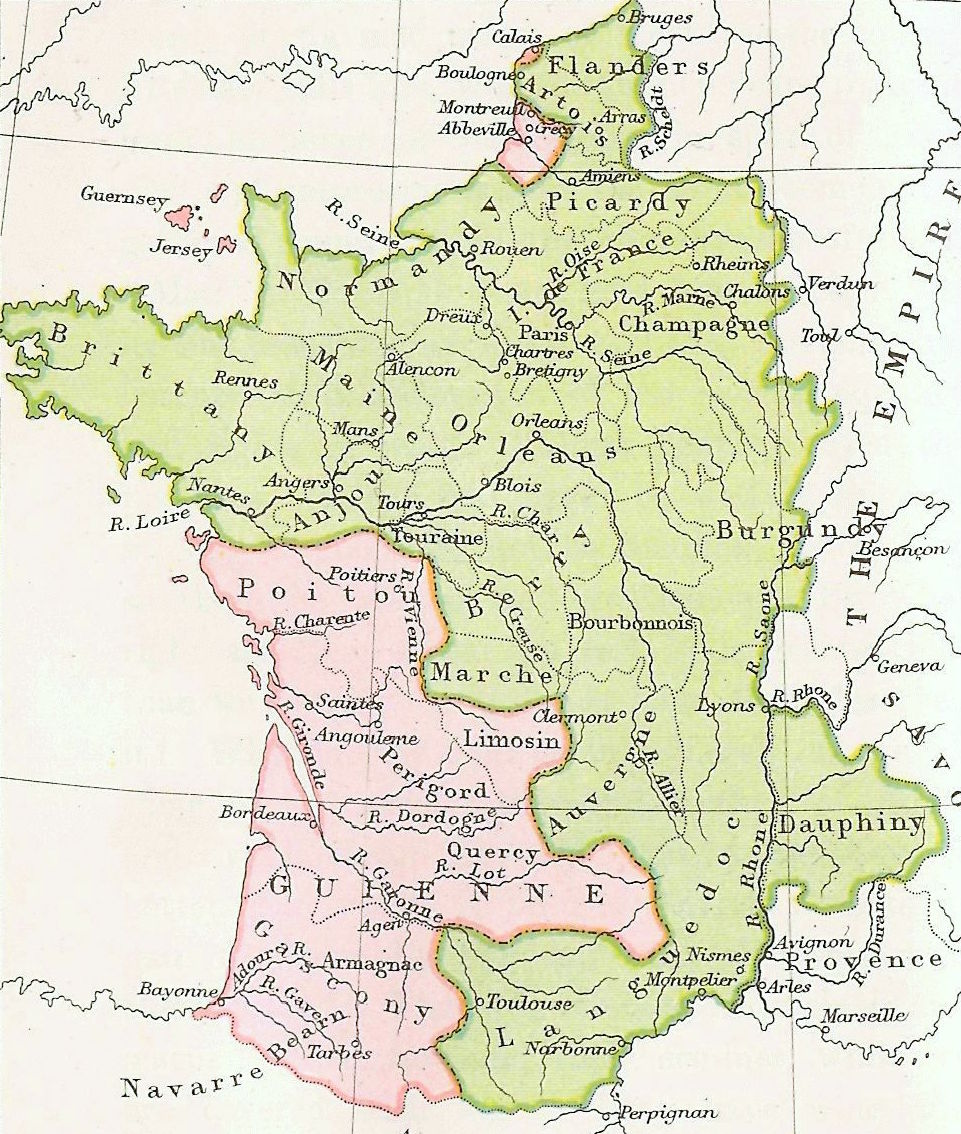
France after the 1360 Treaty of Brétigny; French territory in green, English territory in pink

The Black Prince's chevauchée was described by Rogers as "the most important campaign of the Hundred Years' War". In its aftermath English and Gascon forces raided widely across France, against little or no opposition. With no effective central authority France dissolved into near anarchy. In March 1357 a truce was agreed for two years. In April the Black Prince sailed for England, accompanied by his prisoner, John, and landed at Plymouth on 5 May. By May 1358 protracted negotiations between John and Edward led to the First Treaty of London, which would have ended the war with a large transfer of French territory to England and the payment of a huge ransom for John's freedom. The transfer of territory was much as that agreed in the earlier and abortive Treaty of Guînes. The French government was unenthusiastic and anyway was unable to raise the first instalment of John's ransom, causing the treaty to lapse. A peasant revolt known as the jacquerie broke out in northern France during the summer of 1358 and was bloodily put down during June. At length John and Edward agreed the Second Treaty of London, which was similar to the first except that even larger swathes of French territory would be transferred to the English. In May 1359 this was similarly rejected by the Dauphin and the Estates General.

In October 1359 Edward led another campaign in northern France. It was unopposed by French forces, but was unable to take any strongly fortified places. Instead the English army spread out and for six months devastated much of the region. Both countries were finding it almost impossible to finance continued hostilities, but neither were inclined to change their attitude to the proposed peace terms. On 13 April 1360, near Chartres, a sharp fall in temperature and a heavy hail storm killed many English baggage horses and some soldiers. Taking this as a sign from God, Edward reopened negotiations, directly with the Dauphin. By 8 May the Treaty of Brétigny had been agreed, which largely replicated the First Treaty of London. By the Treaty of Brétigny vast areas of France were ceded to England, to be personally ruled by the Black Prince, and John was ransomed for three million gold écu. Rogers states "Edward gained territories comprising a full third of France, to be held in full sovereignty, along with a huge ransom for the captive King John – his original war aims and much more." At the time it seemed this was the end of the war, but large-scale fighting broke out again in 1369 and France recaptured most of the territory lost. The Hundred Years' War did not end until 1453.

== Notes, citations and sources ==
=== Sources ===
- Burne, Alfred (1999) [1955]. The Crecy War. Ware, Hertfordshire: Wordsworth Editions. ISBN 978-1-84022-210-4.
- Curry, Anne (2002). The Hundred Years' War 1337–1453 (PDF). Oxford: Osprey Publishing (published 13 November 2002). ISBN 978-1-84176-269-2. Archived from the original (PDF) on 27 September 2018.
- Deaux, George (1969). The Black Death, 1347. London: Hamilton. OCLC 242352826.
- Fowler, Kenneth (1961). Henry of Grosmont, First Duke of Lancaster, 1310–1361 (PDF) (PhD thesis). Leeds: University of Leeds. Archived from the original (PDF) on 11 October 2018.
- Fowler, Kenneth Alan (1969). The King's Lieutenant: Henry of Grosmont, First Duke of Lancaster, 1310–1361. New York: Barnes & Noble. ISBN 9780389010036. OCLC 164491035.
- Green, David (2011). The Black Prince. New York: History Press. ISBN 978-0-7524-7306-2.
- Green, David (2013). The Battle of Poitiers 1356. New York: History Press. ISBN 978-0-7524-9634-4.
- Harari, Yuval Noah (1999). "Inter-frontal Cooperation in the Fourteenth Century and Edward III's 1346 Campaign". War in History. 6 (4): 379–395. doi:10.1177/096834459900600401. JSTOR 26013966. S2CID 59055741.
- Harari, Yuval Noah (2007). "For a Sack-full of Gold Écus: Calais 1350". Special Operations in the Age of Chivalry, 1100–1550. Woodbridge, Suffolk: Boydell Press. pp. 109–124. ISBN 978-1-84383-292-8.
- Hewitt, Herbert J. (2004) [1958]. The Black Prince's Expedition of 1355-1357. Barnsley: Pen & Sword. ISBN 978-1-84415-217-9.
- Hoskins, Peter (2011). In the Steps of the Black Prince: The Road to Poitiers, 1355–1356. Woodbridge, Suffolk: Boydell. ISBN 978-1-84383-611-7.
- Jones, Michael J. (2019). The Black Prince : England's Greatest Medieval Warrior. New York: Pegasus. ISBN 978-1-64313-229-7.
- King, Andy (2017). "'Then a Great Misfortune Befell Them': the Laws of War on Surrender and the Killing of Prisoners on the Battlefield in the Hundred Years War" (PDF). Journal of Medieval History. 43 (1): 106–117. doi:10.1080/03044181.2016.1236502. S2CID 159619516. Archived from the original (PDF) on 22 October 2019.
- Madden, Mollie Marie (2014). The Black Prince at War: The Anatomy of a Chevauchée (PDF) (PhD thesis). Minnesota: University of Minnesota.
- Prestwich, Michael (2007). Plantagenet England 1225–1360. Oxford: Oxford University Press. ISBN 978-0-19-922687-0.
- Rodger, N. A. M. (2004). The Safeguard of the Sea. London: Penguin. ISBN 978-0-14-029724-9.
- Rogers, Clifford J. (1994). "Edward III and the Dialectics of Strategy, 1327-1360". Transactions of the Royal Historical Society. 4: 83–102. doi:10.2307/3679216. JSTOR 3679216. OCLC 931311378.
- Rogers, Clifford J. (2004). Bachrach, Bernard S.; DeVries, Kelly & Rogers, Clifford J. (eds.). "The Bergerac Campaign (1345) and the Generalship of Henry of Lancaster". Journal of Medieval Military History. II. Woodbridge, Suffolk: Boydell & Brewer: 89–110. ISBN 978-1-84383-040-5. ISSN 0961-7582.
- Rogers, Clifford J. (2014) [2000]. War Cruel and Sharp: English Strategy under Edward III, 1327–1360. Woodbridge, Suffolk: Boydell Press. ISBN 978-0-85115-804-4.
- Runyan, Timothy J. (2003). "Naval Power and Maritime Technology during the Hundred Years' War". In Hattendorf, John B. & Unger, Richard W. (eds.). War at Sea in the Middle Ages and Renaissance. Woodbridge, Suffolk: Boydell Press. pp. 53–68. ISBN 978-0-85115-903-4.
- Sumption, Jonathan (1990). Trial by Battle. The Hundred Years War. Vol. I. London: Faber and Faber. ISBN 978-0-571-20095-5.
- Sumption, Jonathan (1999). Trial by Fire. The Hundred Years War. Vol. II. London: Faber and Faber. ISBN 978-0-571-13896-8.
- Vale, Malcolm (1999). "The War in Aquitaine". In Curry, Anne & Hughes, Michael (eds.). Arms, Armies and Fortifications in the Hundred Years War. Woodbridge, Suffolk: Boydell & Brewer. pp. 69–82. ISBN 978-0-85115-755-9.
- Wagner, John A. (2006). Encyclopedia of the Hundred Years War. Westport, CT, US: Greenwood Press. ISBN 978-0-313-32736-0.
- Wagner, John A. (2006a). "Armies, Composition of". Encyclopedia of the Hundred Years War. Woodbridge, Suffolk: Greenwood. pp. 21–23. ISBN 978-0-313-32736-0.
- Wagner, John A. (2006b). "Charles the Bad, King of Navarre (1332–1387)". Encyclopedia of the Hundred Years War. Woodbridge, Suffolk: Greenwood. pp. 74–75. ISBN 978-0-313-32736-0.
- Wagner, John A. (2006c). "Guines, Treaty of". Encyclopedia of the Hundred Years War. Woodbridge, Suffolk: Greenwood. pp. 160–164. ISBN 978-0-313-32736-0.
- Wagner, John A. (2006d). "Jacquerie (1358)". Encyclopedia of the Hundred Years War. Woodbridge, Suffolk: Greenwood. pp. 171–172. ISBN 978-0-313-32736-0.
- Wagner, John A. (2006e). "Black Death". Encyclopedia of the Hundred Years War. Woodbridge, Suffolk: Greenwood. pp. 53–54. ISBN 978-0-313-32736-0.
