= Loire Campaign =

Loire Campaign may refer to:

- Lancaster's Loire campaign of 1356
- Loire Campaign (1429)
- Loire Campaign (1870)
