= Black Prince's chevauchée of 1355 =

1355 mounted raid during the Hundred Years' War

Chevauchée of the Black Prince (1355) Grande chevauchée
- Part of Hundred Years' War
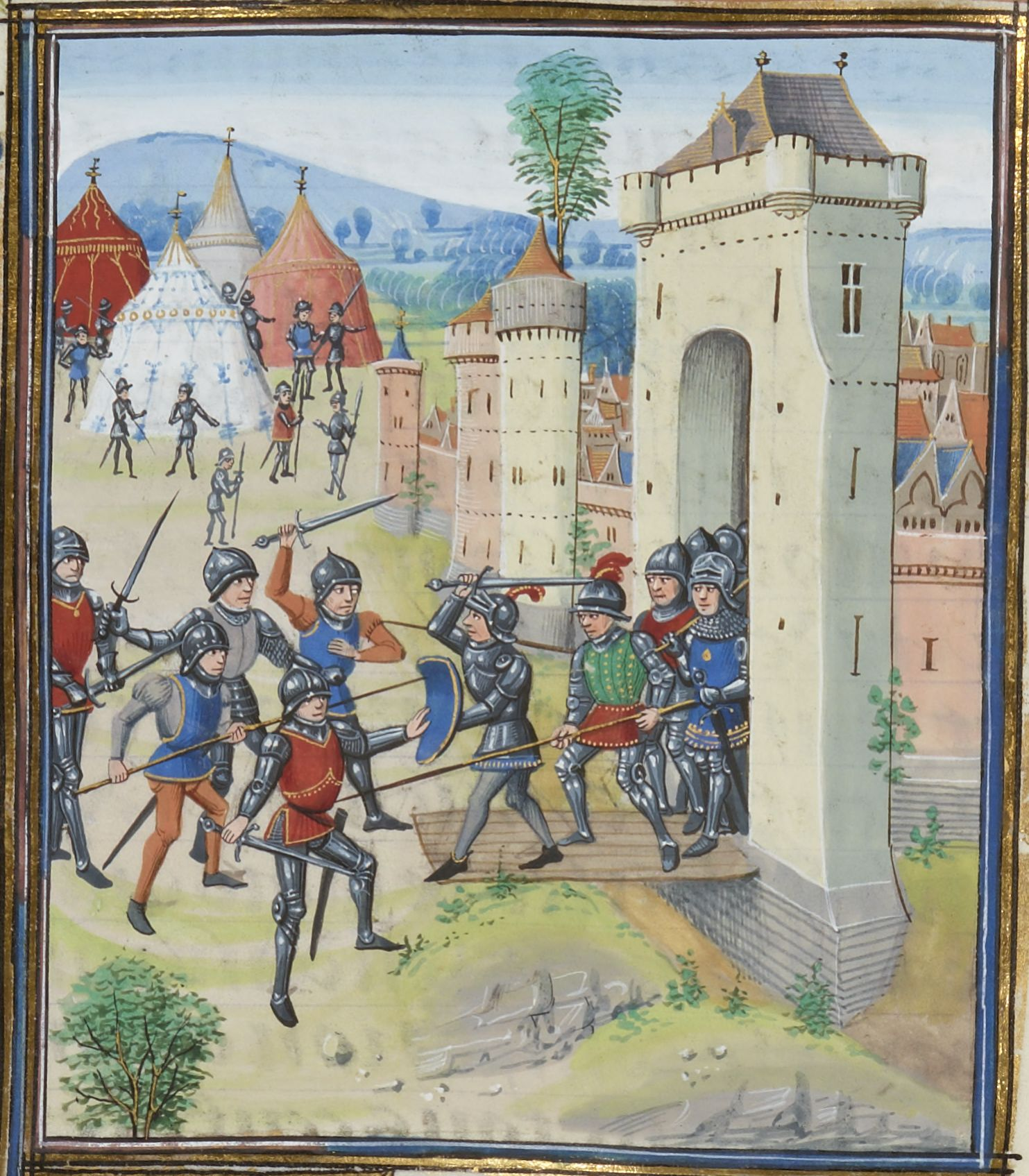
- A medieval town under assault
Date	5 October – 2 December 1355
Location	Southern France
Result	English victory

Belligerents
Kingdom of England	Kingdom of France

Commanders and leaders
Edward, the Black Prince	Jean I de Armagnac; James de Bourbon; Jean de Clermont

Strength
5,000–6,000	Unknown

Casualties and losses
Unknown, but few	Unknown

A large-scale chevauchée (mounted raid) was carried out by an Anglo-Gascon force under the command of Edward, the Black Prince, between 5 October and 2 December 1355 as a part of the Hundred Years' War. Count John I of Armagnac, who commanded the local French forces, avoided battle, and there was little fighting during the campaign.

The Anglo-Gascon force of 4,000 to 6,000 men marched from Bordeaux in English-held Gascony 300 miles (480 km) to Narbonne and back to Gascony, devastating a wide swathe of French territory and sacking many French towns on the way. While no territory was captured, enormous economic damage was done to France; the modern historian Clifford Rogers concluded that "the importance of the economic attrition aspect of the chevauchée can hardly be exaggerated." The English component resumed the offensive after Christmas to great effect, and more than 50 French-held towns or fortifications were captured during the following four months. In August 1356 the Black Prince headed north on another devastating chevauchée with 6,000 men; he was intercepted by the main French army, 11,000 strong, and forced to battle at Poitiers, where he decisively defeated the French and captured King John II of France.

== Background ==
Since the Norman Conquest of 1066, English monarchs had held titles and lands within France, the possession of which made them vassals of the kings of France. Following a series of disagreements between Philip VI of France (r. 1328–1350) and Edward III of England (r. 1327–1377), on 24 May 1337 Philip's Great Council in Paris agreed that the lands held by Edward in France should be taken back into Philip's hands on the grounds that Edward was in breach of his obligations as a vassal. This marked the start of the Hundred Years' War, which was to last 116 years.

Before the war commenced, at least 1,000 ships a year departed Gascony. Among their cargoes were more than 80,000 tuns of wine. (Note: The tun was a wine cask used as a standard measure, and contained 252 gallons (954 litres) of wine. Eighty thousand tuns of wine equates to 76.32 million litres (16.79 million imperial gallons; 20.16 million US gallons).) The duty levied by the English Crown on wine from Bordeaux, the capital of Gascony, was more than all other customs duties combined and by far the largest source of state income. Bordeaux had a population of more than 50,000, greater than London's, and Bordeaux was possibly richer. However, by this time English Gascony had become so truncated by French encroachments that it relied on imports of food, mostly from England. Any interruptions to regular shipping were liable to starve Gascony and financially cripple England; the French were well aware of this.

France in 1330. The diminished Gascony alone, along with some smaller territories, remained under the English crown.

Although Gascony was the cause of the war, Edward was able to spare few resources for its defence, and previously when an English army had campaigned on the continent it had operated in northern France. In most campaigning seasons the Gascons had to rely on their own resources and had been hard-pressed by the French. In 1339 the French besieged Bordeaux, the capital of Gascony, even breaking into the city with a strong force before they were repulsed. Typically the Gascons could muster 3,000–6,000 men, the large majority infantry, although up to two-thirds of them would be tied down in garrisons. In July 1346, Edward landed the main English army in Normandy in northern France. Philip concentrated French forces against this threat and over the following year the Anglo-Gascons were able to push the focus of the fighting away from the heart of Gascony.

The French port of Calais fell to the English on 3 August 1347 after an eleven-month siege and shortly after the Truce of Calais was signed. This was partially the result of both countries being financially exhausted. In the same year, the Black Death reached northern France and southern England, resulting in the death of approximately 45 per cent of the population. Fighting continued in Picardy and Brittany, and especially fiercely in south-west France, where the English raided deep into French territory, but no large forces took the field. Negotiations for a permanent peace commenced in 1353 in Avignon under the auspices of Pope Innocent VI and the war died down to skirmishes and small-scale raids. These talks collapsed in early 1355. In April 1355 Edward and his council, with the treasury in an unusually favourable financial position, decided to launch offensives that year in both northern France and Gascony. John II of France (r. 1350–1364) attempted to strongly garrison his northern towns and fortifications against the expected descent by Edward, at the same time assembling a field army; he was unable to, largely due to lack of money.

== Prelude ==
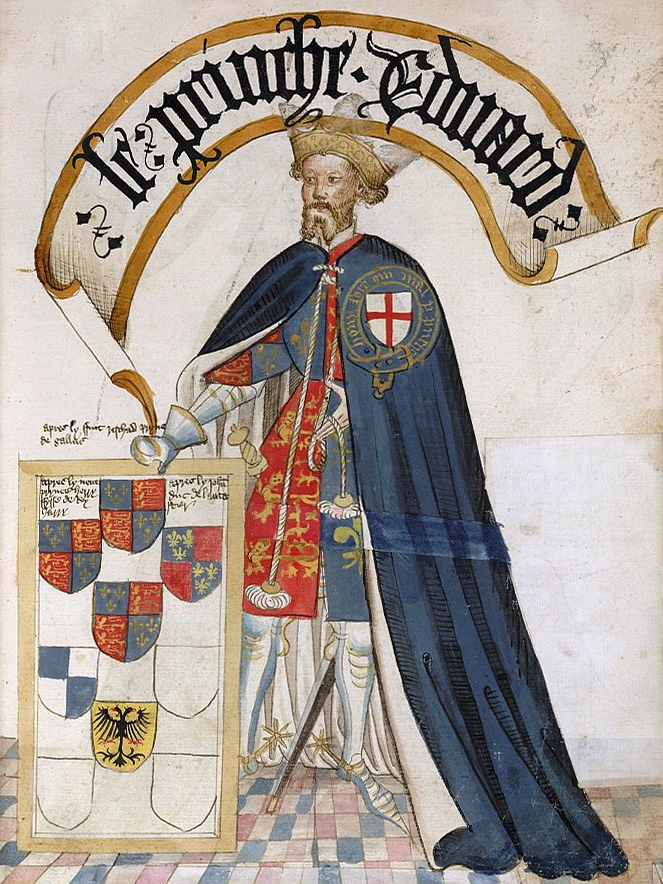
Edward, the Black Prince

In their 1345 and 1346 Gascon campaigns, the English had pushed the main front back well beyond the borders of Gascony to the north and west, among other things guaranteeing its food supplies and putting the Gascon territory beyond reach of French advances from those directions. Numerous French-held castles and small towns remained within what was nominally English territory, just as the English had outposts deep within French territory. To the immediate south lay the County of Armagnac, largely untouched by the war. It was the heartland of John, Count of Armagnac, the French King's personal representative in the south west and the most powerful French noble in the region. John had long been a proponent of pressing the war against Gascony. He had ignored his orders to keep the truce in 1354, raiding repeatedly into Agenais and besieging several important towns, albeit unsuccessfully. In spring 1355 he again made unsuccessful attempts to capture English-held towns. Frustrated, and with the peace talks having failed, he launched repeated raids deep into Gascony throughout the summer, to great effect. He devastated agricultural areas and burnt down the suburbs of several Gascon towns.

Edward III's eldest son, Edward of Woodstock, later commonly known as the Black Prince, was given the Gascon command and began assembling men, shipping and supplies. He was scheduled to sail in July, but eventually set off on 9 September, arriving in Bordeaux, the capital of Gascony, on the 20th accompanied by 2,200 English soldiers. The next day he was formally acknowledged as the king's lieutenant in Gascony, with plenipotentiary powers. The Gascon nobility pressed on him the advantages of striking at the County of Armagnac. The Black Prince agreed to make Armagnac his first target. Gascon nobles, who had been preparing for the expedition for some time, reinforced him to a strength of somewhere between 5,000 and 6,000 and provided a bridging train and a substantial supply train. The latter largely carried grain for the horses, although later it was used to transport the spoils of the chevauchée.

The English expedition to Normandy was intended to be carried out with the cooperation of the French magnate Charles II of Navarre, but Charles reneged on the agreement. Instead a chevauchée, a large-scale mounted raid, was attempted from the English enclave of Calais in November. However, the French King had stripped the area of fodder, food and potential booty, causing the English to return to Calais within ten days. They had achieved nothing, but did focus French attention on the north.

== Chevauchée ==
=== Heading east ===
The route of the chevauchée

On 5 October 1355 the Black Prince's Anglo-Gascon force left Bordeaux on their own carefully planned chevauchée. It took in reinforcements and supplies at Saint-Macaire, 30 miles (48 km) to the south, and continued through Bazas, reaching the border with Armagnac on 12 October. The rapid march to this point caused many of the expedition's 15,000 horses to die or break down, especially those which had accompanied the English on the exhausting eleven-day sea voyage and been given inadequate time to recover; this had been allowed for, and they were replaced locally. Before crossing the border new knights were dubbed, as if it were the eve of a formal battle, and banners were unfurled. As soon as Armagnac was entered, the army started devastating the countryside; the Anglo-Gascons divided into three columns, which marched parallel to each other, to maximise the destruction. Over eleven days the chevauchée traversed Armagnac from west to east, in sight of the Pyrenees. The weather was fine, and one combatant reported the area to be "a noble, rich and beautiful region". Most towns were fortified in name only and were easily stormed and burnt. Within reach of the line of march only two towns escaped destruction. The Black Prince wrote "we rode ... through the land of Armagnac, harrying and wasting the country, the [Gascon lords] were much comforted."

John of Armagnac deliberately avoided battle, even though the French forces in the region outnumbered the English. He was reinforced by James de Bourbon, Constable of France, and Jean de Clermont, Marshal of France, and the French concentrated in the strongly fortified large city of Toulouse, expecting a siege. They broke the bridges enabling access to the city and confidently expected the Black Prince to withdraw to Gascony once he saw the strength of the fortifications. The English passed within a few miles of the city and continued east, fording the strongly flowing Garonne and Ariège rivers; the former was described by a member of the expedition as "rough, rocky and most frightening" and the latter as even "more dangerous". Several horses and a small, but unknown, number of men were lost during the operation, but the supply wagons all crossed successfully. This took the French by surprise; they had not even guarded the fords.

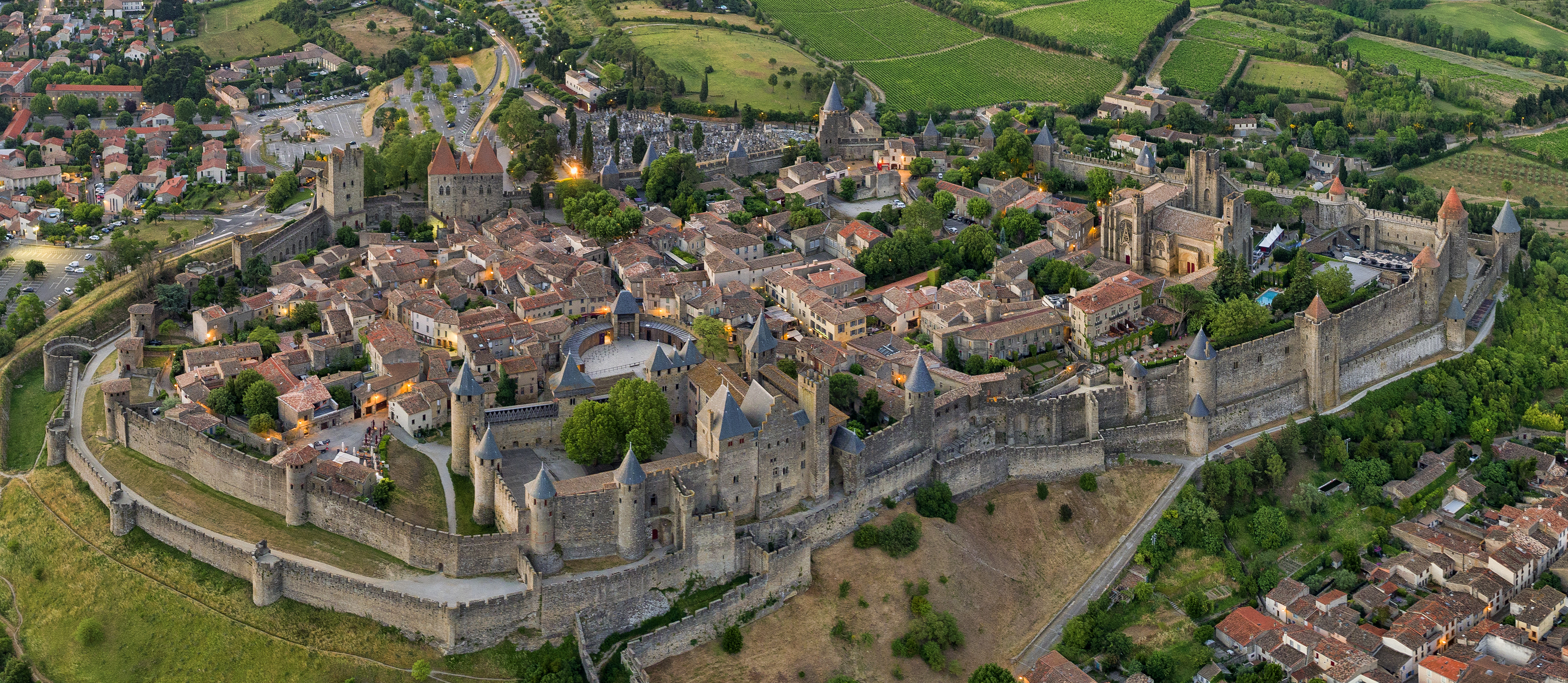
The walls of the old town of Carcassone, pictured in 2016

The area they now passed through was known as the granary of southern France; a contemporary described the area east of Toulouse as the "fattest land in the world". The English continued to burn everything they could, targeting windmills in particular, as a region unable to grind its own grain was unlikely to be able to provide a surplus to support the French military. As before, they stormed all but the largest towns and strongest castles, often amidst brutality and slaughter. Small groups ranged at least 24 miles (39 km) from the main body, looting and burning smaller places across a wide front. The major city of Carcassonne, 50 miles (80 km) east of Toulouse, was the cultural, political, religious and financial centre of the area and was captured when the population abandoned the town and retreated to the strongly fortified citadel. They offered a huge sum if the English would spare the town, but this was refused. After three days of rest and looting the town was thoroughly fired. The tax records for the region were also captured, which enabled the English to form an accurate view of the damage they were doing to the French economy and war effort. They continued east, in weather which had turned wintery: "the whole area was burned" according to a participant. Two days later, on 8 November, they reached Narbonne, 10 miles (16 km) from the Mediterranean. It was only a little less populous than London, but again the town was rapidly captured and sacked while the citadel was ignored. The French in the citadel responded by bombarding the English with artillery.

The whole of southern France was in uproar. A major offensive so late in the year had not been expected and the Black Prince's willingness to march 300 miles (480 km) from his base, crossing rivers considered impassable to large bodies and living off the land, took the French completely by surprise. English scouts, foragers and arson parties pushed out in all directions from Narbonne, some as far as 30 miles (48 km). French towns up to 100 miles (160 km) away began hastily reinforcing their fortifications. Two nuncios arrived from Pope Innocent, attempting to arrange a truce; they were turned away, being told to apply to Edward III.

=== Returning west ===
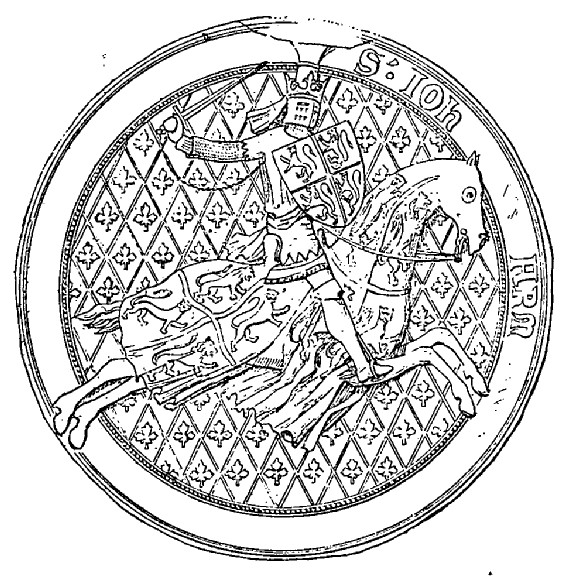
John, Count of Armagnac

John of Armagnac, with Bourbon and Clermont, moved at least part of the French army to Homps, 15 miles (24 km) west of Narbonne, where the road crossed the River Aude. They apparently hoped to force the English to attack them across the river, and so fight at an advantage. The English were unable to remain in any one place for long, as it soon became stripped of food, especially fodder and grain for the 15,000 horses with the army. So on 10 November the English moved out from Narbonne, their rearguard and stragglers being harassed by a sortie of the town militia. The English crossed the Aude north of Narbonne and then headed north-east towards Béziers; their scouts reported that the town was strongly held, and so after a council of war they turned back to the west, expecting to have to fight Armagnac's force. It was an arduous march and water was short; one chronicler writes that the horses, which would normally require 120,000 imperial gallons (550,000 L; 140,000 US gal) of water each day, had to be given wine instead. The French retreated to Toulouse, not wishing to meet the English on equal terms, when they anticipated that the English combined arms tactics and use of longbowmen would lead to their defeat. The Black Prince pursued them as far as Carcassonne, where, struggling to forage in territory which had already been well picked over, he struck south towards the prosperous city of Limoux, which was destroyed.

On Sunday 15 November the English army razed four large French towns and devastated the surrounding area, while their leaders were inducted as lay brothers at the Dominican monastery at Prouille. The English then turned east again, across the County of Foix. On the 17th the Black Prince met with Gaston, Count of Foix, the most powerful French noble in the region after Armagnac, and a great enemy of his. The details of the discussion are unknown, but Gaston allowed the English free passage, arranged provisions, allowed his men to join the Black Prince's army and provided guides. The weather was bad, and the going difficult; the army again forded the Garonne and Ariège in flood, to the amazement of locals. Numerous towns not belonging to Gaston were looted and burnt.

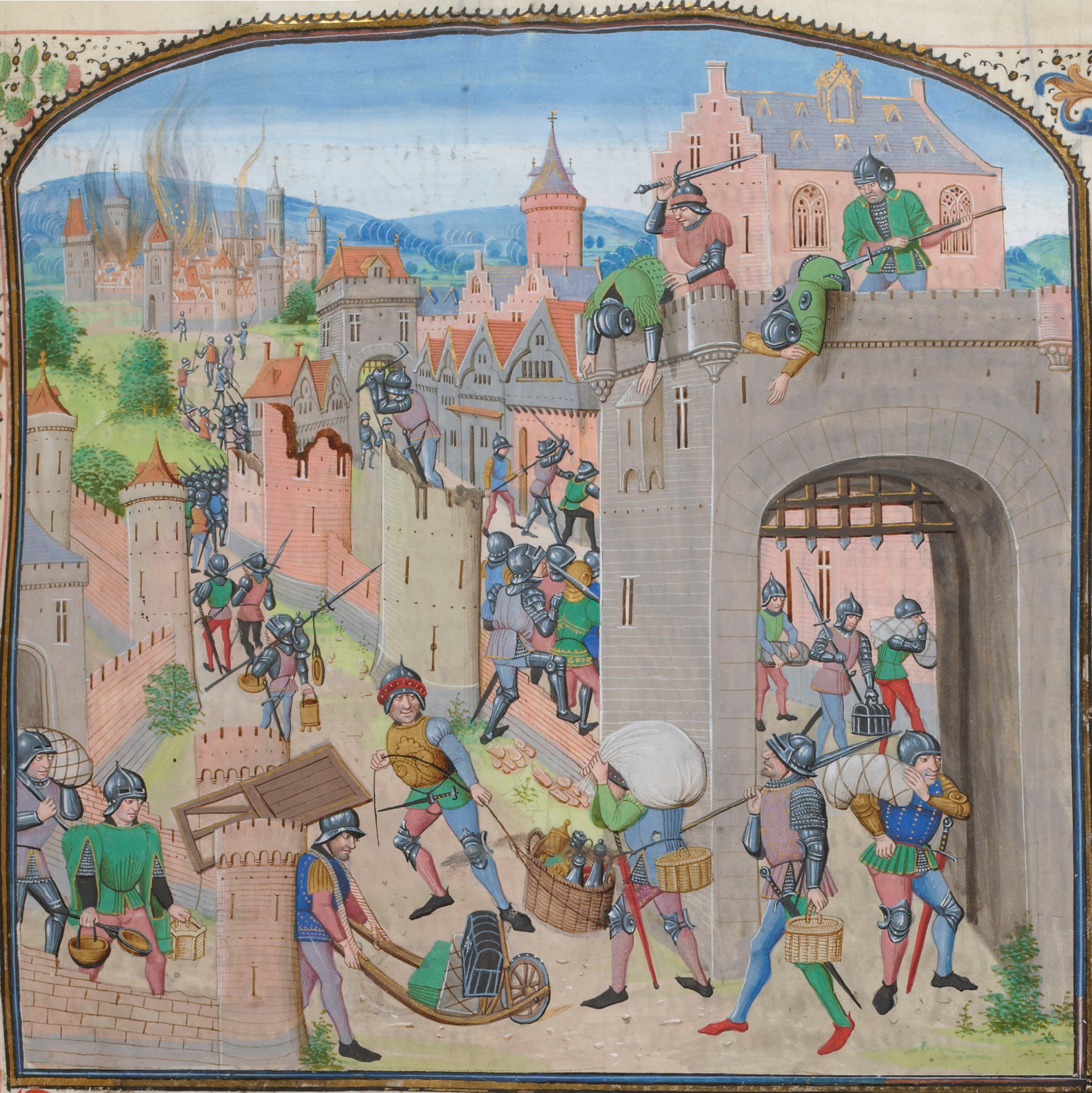
A town being sacked

The French were initially quiescent as the English swung wide to the south of Toulouse, but James of Bourbon persuaded John of Armagnac to lead the French army south-west from Toulouse on 18 November in an attempt to cut off the English. They hoped to turn back the English at the River Save, in eastern Armagnac, and so strand them in French territory. The two advance guards met in a fierce clash on 20 November; the French were defeated and they retreated. The English followed and camped close to the French on the 22nd, in formation, anticipating a battle the next day, but the numerically superior French withdrew during the night. The English headed directly for Gascony, following a different route to that of six weeks earlier. The marching was hard and water was short in places, causing an increase in deaths among the horses. On 28 November the English crossed the border of Gascony, and many Gascons left at this point. The balance of the army returned to La Réole on 2 December, having marched 675 miles (1,100 km); the Black Prince and his entourage moved on to Bordeaux on the 9th.

== Effect ==
Contemporary accounts agree the chevauchée left immense destruction in its wake, and that an enormous amount of booty was seized; according to one account, English soldiers jettisoned the silver they had looted, in order to be able to carry all the gold and jewellery available. It was reported that the formal booty took 1,000 carts to transport; a gross exaggeration, but indicative of the impression the amount of loot seized made on contemporaries. The French knights and merchants captured were ransomed.

While no territory was captured, enormous economic damage was done to France. Carcassonne alone generated more tax than seven entire provinces combined. The four main cities burnt down alone paid for 1,000 men-at-arms and generated an additional 100,000 écu in tax each year; if unadulterated this would be approximately half a tonne (0.5 ton) of silver, or two per cent of the French Crown's annual income. It was estimated that the towns destroyed generated a total of 400,000 écu annually in war taxes. All were subsequently given considerable tax exemptions and trade privileges for many years. For example, the town of Avignonet was exempted from war taxes for seven years. In addition, 500 villages were destroyed. The modern historian Clifford Rogers concluded that "the importance of the economic attrition aspect of the chevauchée can hardly be exaggerated."

As well as the direct financial effects, towns throughout the south of France looked to their defences, spending large amounts over several years on building or repairing fortifications, and being much less willing to let troops raised locally serve away from home. Contemporaries, including the Black Prince, considered the chevauchée to have been as successful in non-financial terms as in financial, itemising the punishment of minor lords who had switched sides to the French; the persuasion of local magnates, especially Gaston of Foix, to move towards the English; the securing of Gascony against attack from the south; and the establishment of a moral ascendancy over the French forces. All this had been achieved during the Black Prince's first independent command and with almost no losses among the Anglo-Gascons.

== Aftermath ==
The majority of the Gascon troops involved in the chevauchée dispersed to their homes for winter. After a three-week break and an enthusiastic celebration of Christmas the English force, plus a small number of Gascons, was divided into four groups and resumed the offensive. French morale was low, and the lack of money for wages kept garrisons small. More than 50 French-held towns or fortifications were captured during the following four months, including strategically important towns close to the borders of Gascony, and others over 80 miles (130 km) away. Armagnac put John of Boucicaut in charge of defending this front over the winter, but as he had only 600 men he felt there was little he could do. Other, local, French commanders felt similarly under-resourced and attempted no countermeasures. Several members of the local French nobility went over to the English; the Black Prince received homage from them on 24 April 1356.

Reinforcements of men and horses and supplies of food and materiel arrived from England during the spring, and at the start of August 1356 the Black Prince headed north on another chevauchée with an Anglo-Gascon force of 6,000. He penetrated as far as the Loire, then withdrew, pursued by the main French army, 11,000 strong, under John II. The English were forced to battle at Poitiers, where they decisively defeated the French and captured John II.

== Notes, citations and sources ==
=== Sources ===
- Burne, Alfred (1999) [1955]. The Crecy War. Ware, Hertfordshire: Wordsworth Editions. ISBN 978-1-84022-210-4.
- Curry, Anne (2002). The Hundred Years' War 1337–1453 (PDF). Oxford: Osprey Publishing. ISBN 978-1-84176-269-2. Archived from the original (PDF) on 27 September 2018.
- Deaux, George (1969). The Black Death, 1347. London: Hamilton. OCLC 242352826.
- Fowler, Kenneth (1961). Henry of Grosmont, First Duke of Lancaster, 1310–1361 (PDF) (PhD thesis). Leeds: University of Leeds. Archived from the original (PDF) on 11 October 2018.
- Fowler, Kenneth Alan (1969). The King's Lieutenant: Henry of Grosmont, First Duke of Lancaster, 1310–1361. New York: Barnes & Noble. ISBN 978-0-389-01003-6. OCLC 164491035.
- Harari, Yuval Noah (1999). "Inter-frontal Cooperation in the Fourteenth Century and Edward III's 1346 Campaign". War in History. 6 (4): 379–395. doi:10.1177/096834459900600401. JSTOR 26013966. S2CID 59055741.
- Hyland, Ann (1994). The Medieval Warhorse: from Byzantium to the Crusades. Dover: Alan Sutton Publishing. ISBN 978-0-86299-983-4.
- Lewis, Carenza (June 2016). "Disaster Recovery: New Archaeological Evidence for the Long-Term Impact of the 'Calamitous' Fourteenth Century". Antiquity. 90 (351): 777–797. doi:10.15184/aqy.2016.69. ISSN 0003-598X. S2CID 164178697.
- Madden, Mollie Marie (2014). The Black Prince at War: The Anatomy of a Chevauchée (PDF) (PhD thesis). Minnesota: University of Minnesota.
- Prestwich, Michael (2007). Plantagenet England 1225–1360. Oxford: Oxford University Press. ISBN 978-0-19-922687-0.
- Rodger, N. A. M. (2004). The Safeguard of the Sea. London: Penguin. ISBN 978-0-14-029724-9.
- Rogers, Clifford J. (1994). "Edward III and the Dialectics of Strategy, 1327-1360". Transactions of the Royal Historical Society. 4: 83–102. doi:10.2307/3679216. JSTOR 3679216. OCLC 931311378. S2CID 163041276.
- Rogers, Clifford J. (2004). Bachrach, Bernard S.; DeVries, Kelly & Rogers, Clifford J (eds.). "The Bergerac Campaign (1345) and the Generalship of Henry of Lancaster". Journal of Medieval Military History. Vol. II. Woodbridge, Suffolk: Boydell & Brewer. ISBN 978-1-84383-040-5. ISSN 0961-7582.
- Sumption, Jonathan (1990). Trial by Battle. The Hundred Years' War. Vol. I. London: Faber and Faber. ISBN 978-0-571-20095-5.
- Sumption, Jonathan (1999). Trial by Fire. The Hundred Years' War. Vol. II. London: Faber and Faber. ISBN 978-0-571-13896-8.
- Wagner, John A. (2006). Encyclopedia of the Hundred Years War (PDF). Westport, CT: Greenwood Press. ISBN 978-0-313-32736-0. Archived from the original (PDF) on 16 July 2018.
