= The Battlefields of England =

1950 nonfiction book by A. H. Burne

- Author: A. H. Burne
- Publisher: Methuen
- Publication date: 1950

The Battlefields of England was a work of non-fiction by A. H. Burne first published in 1950 by Methuen. A sequel, More Battlefields of England, followed in 1952. In 1996 the two works were combined under "The Battlefields of England" title.

The book explores battlefields in respect of the following battles:

- Caradoc's Last Fight AD 51
- The Battle of Mount Badon AD 500
- The Battle of Deorham AD 577
- Wansdyke and the Battle of Ellandun AD 825
- The Battle of Ashdown 8 January 871
- The Battle of Ethandun AD 878
- The Battle of Brunanburh AD 937
- The Battle of Maldon August 991
- The Battle of Assingdon 18 October 1016
- The Battle of Stamford Bridge 25 September 1066
- The Battle of Hastings 14 October 1066
- The Battle of the Standard, or Northallerton: 22 August 1138
- The Battle of Lewes 14 May 1264)
- The Battle of Evesham 4 August 1265)
- The Battle of Neville's Cross 17 October 1346
- The Battle of Otterburn 19 August 1388
- The Battle of Shrewsbury 21 July 1403
- The First Battle of St. Albans 22 May 1455
- The Battle of Blore Heath 23 September 1459
- The Second Battle of St. Albans 17 February
- The Battle of Towton 29 March 1461
- The Battle of Barnet 14 April 1471
- The Battle of Tewkesbury 14 May 1471
- The Battle of Bosworth 22 August 1485
- The Battle of Stoke Field 16 June 1487
- The Battle of Flodden 9 September 1513
- The Battle of Edgehill 22 October 1642
- The Battle of Lansdown 5 July 1643
- The Battle of Roundway Down 13 July 1643
- The First Battle of Newbury 20 October 1643
- The Battle of Cheriton 29 March 1644
- The Battle of Marston Moor 2 July 1644
- The Second Battle of Newbury 28 October 1644
- The Battle of Naseby 14 June 1645
- The Battle of Langport 10 July 1645
- The Battle of Worcester 3 September 1651
- The Battle of Sedgemoor 6 July 1685
