= Lancaster's Loire campaign of 1356 =

- Part of the Hundred Years' War
| Date | August – September 1356 |
| Location | North-west France |

Belligerents
| Kingdom of England | Kingdom of France |

Commanders and leaders
| Henry, Earl of Lancaster | |

Lancaster's Loire campaign was the march south from Brittany in August 1356 by an English army led by Henry, Duke of Lancaster. He was attempting to join the army of Edward, the Black Prince, near Tours. The French had broken the bridges over the River Loire and Lancaster was forced to turn back, returning to Brittany in September.

== Chevauchée ==
In August 1356 Henry, Duke of Lancaster, marched south from eastern Brittany with an army of unknown size. It took the form of a large-scale mounted raid (a chevauchée). It was his intention to join the army of Edward, the Black Prince, the eldest son of the English king, Edward III. This had marched north from Bergerac on the 4th of August. It was planned that the two would meet in the general vicinity of Tours. Lancaster brought with him from Normandy 2,500 men. He also had under his command over 2,000 men garrisoning the English-held fortifications of Brittany. The extent to which he added the men from these garrisons to the troops he brought with him is not known.

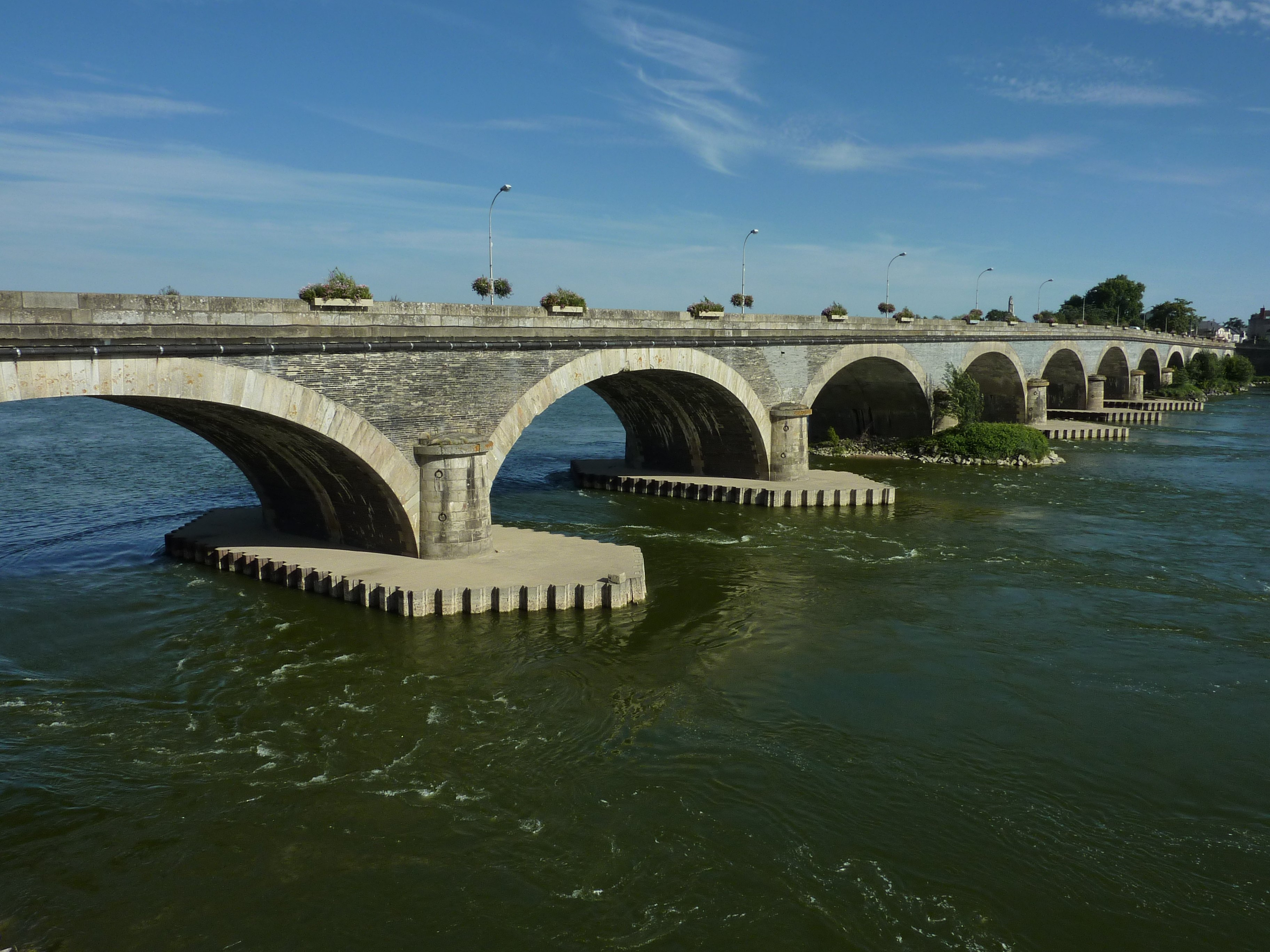
The 19th-century Dumnacus Bridge over the Loire at Les Ponts-de-Cé

Due to the unseasonable fullness of the River Loire, across which the French had destroyed or strongly fortified all the bridges, Lancaster was unable to effect a junction. In early September he abandoned the attempt to force a crossing at Les Ponts-de-Cé and returned to Brittany. En route he captured and garrisoned a substantial number of French strongpoints. Once in Brittany he laid siege to its capital, Rennes.

The Prince also returned towards his starting point, but his delay waiting for Lancaster near Tours enabled a French army under the command of their king, John II to overtake him. As a result, the Prince was forced to commit to the Battle of Poitiers, where the French were heavily defeated.

== Citations and sources ==
=== Sources ===
- Burne, Alfred (1999) [1955]. The Crecy War. Ware, Hertfordshire: Wordsworth Editions. ISBN 978-1840222104.
- Fowler, Kenneth Alan (1969). The King's Lieutenant: Henry of Grosmont, First Duke of Lancaster, 1310–1361. New York: Barnes & Noble. ISBN 9780389010036. OCLC 164491035.
- Rogers, Clifford J. (2004). Bachrach, Bernard S.; DeVries, Kelly & Rogers, Clifford J (eds.). "The Bergerac Campaign (1345) and the Generalship of Henry of Lancaster". Journal of Medieval Military History. Vol. II. Woodbridge, Suffolk: Boydell & Brewer. ISBN 978-1843830405. ISSN 0961-7582.
- Rogers, Clifford J. (2014) [2000]. War Cruel and Sharp: English Strategy under Edward III, 1327–1360. Woodbridge, Suffolk: Boydell Press. ISBN 978-0851158044.
- Sumption, Jonathan (1990). Trial by Battle. The Hundred Years' War. Vol. I. London: Faber and Faber. ISBN 978-0571200955.
- Sumption, Jonathan (1999). Trial by Fire. The Hundred Years' War. Vol. II. London: Faber and Faber. ISBN 0-571138969.
- Wagner, John A. (2006). "Poitier, Battle of (1356)". Encyclopedia of the Hundred Years War. Woodbridge, Suffolk: Greenwood. pp. 160–164. ISBN 978-0-313-32736-0.
