= Jean de Clermont =

14th-century Marshal of France

Jean de Clermont (French pronunciation: [ʒɑ̃ də klɛʁmɔ̃]; died 19 September 1356), Lord of Chantilly and of Beaumont, was a Marshal of France (1352) who was killed fighting in the Hundred Years' War at the Battle of Poitiers.

Jean de Clermont served under the Count of Eu in 1340 during the campaigns in Hainault and Flanders. The following years he fought in Normandy, Avignon and the Languedoc. In 1352 he was sent to Flanders to negotiate a truce with the English. After the signing of the truce he was made governor of Poitou, Saintonge, Angoumois, Périgord and Limousin (1354).

In 1356, Jean advised King John II of France not to engage the English in battle but to surround them and starve them. His advice ignored, King John II decided to engage the English at Nouaillé-Maupertuis, south of Poitiers. Jean was killed during the battle which ended in a military disaster for the French, and the capture of the King.

== Sources ==
- Hoskins, Peter (2013). In the Steps of the Black Prince: The Road to Poitiers, 1355-1356. The Boydell Press.
