= Clifford J. Rogers =

American military historian

Clifford J. Rogers is a professor of history at the United States Military Academy at West Point. He has also been a Leverhulme Visiting Professor at Swansea University, an Olin Fellow in Military and Strategic History at Yale, and a Fulbright Fellow at the Institute of Historical Research in London.

== Career ==
Rogers writes mainly on medieval military history.

Rogers is the editor of the three-volume Oxford Encyclopedia of Medieval Warfare and Military Technology, which received a Distinguished Book Award from the Society for Military History, The Wars of Edward III: Sources and Interpretations, and The Military Revolution Debate. He is co-editor of The Journal of Medieval Military History, The West Point History of the Civil War, The West Point History of World War II, and The West Point History of the American Revolution (each of which received an Army Historical Foundation Distinguished Writing Award), and the essay collection Civilians in the Path of War. He is co-Senior Editor of the 71-chapter interactive digital military history textbook The West Point History of Warfare, which received the 2016 Society of Military History - George C. Marshall Foundation Prize for the Use of Digital Technology in Teaching Military History.

Although Rogers' work on military revolutions has found favor with many historians, some (including Kelly DeVries and John Stone) argue that his analysis suffers from "technological determinism."

== Honors and awards ==
His War Cruel and Sharp: English Strategy under Edward III, 1327-1360 won the 2003 Verbruggen Prize awarded by De Re Militari. He has also been awarded the Royal Historical Society's Alexander Prize medal and a Society for Military History Moncado Prize for his articles, some of which are collected in his Essays on Medieval Military History: Strategy, Military Revolutions and the Hundred Years War.

His Soldiers' Lives through History: The Middle Ages received the 2009 Verbruggen Prize. A podcast of a lecture based on part of that book, focusing on the soldier's experience of battle, has been posted online by the New York Military Affairs Symposium.

Professor Rogers is the only West Point faculty member to have received the Dean’s Career Award for Distinguished Excellence in both the teaching and the scholarship categories.

== Select bibliography ==
The Military Revolution Debate, ed. Clifford J. Rogers (Boulder: Westview 1995).

The Wars of Edward III: Sources and Interpretations, ed. Clifford J. Rogers (Woodbridge: Boydell and Brewer, 1999). [Paperback ed. 2010.]

War Cruel and Sharp: English Strategy under Edward III, 1327-1360 (Woodbridge: Boydell and Brewer, 2000). [Paperback ed. 2014.]

Soldiers’ Lives through History: The Middle Ages (New York: Greenwood, 2007).

Essays on Medieval Military History: Strategy, Military Revolutions, and the Hundred Years War (London: Ashgate/Variorum, 2010).

The Oxford Encyclopedia of Medieval Warfare and Military Technology, ed. Clifford J. Rogers. 3 vols. (Oxford: Oxford U. P. 2010).

The West Point History of World War II, ed. Clifford J. Rogers, Ty Seidule, and Seve R. Waddell. 2 vols. (New York: Simon & Schuster, 2015-2018).

A Cultural History of War in The Medieval Age, ed. Clifford J. Rogers (London: Bloomsbury Academic, 2025).
