= Alfred Burne =

English soldier and military historian (1886-1959)

Alfred Burne DSO
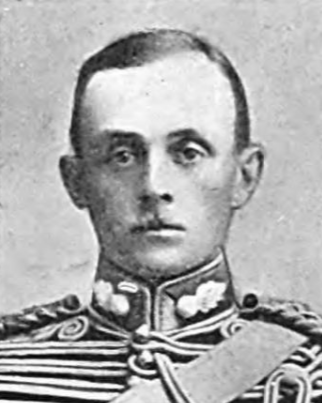
- Born: 1886
- Died: 1959 (aged 72–73)
- Occupation: Military Historian
- Military career
- Allegiance: United Kingdom
- Branch: British Army
- Service years: 1906–1945
- Rank: Lieutenant Colonel
- Unit: Royal Artillery
- Commands: 121st Officer Cadet Training Unit
- Awards: Distinguished Service Order

Alfred Higgins Burne DSO (1886–1959) was a soldier and military historian. He invented the concept of Inherent Military Probability; in battles and campaigns where there is some doubt over what action was taken, Burne believed that the action taken would be one which a trained staff officer of the twentieth century would take.

== Career ==
Alfred Burne was educated at Winchester College and RMA Woolwich, before being commissioned into the Royal Artillery in 1906. He was awarded the DSO during the First World War and, during the Second World War, was Commandant of the 121st Officer Cadet Training Unit. He retired as a Lieutenant-Colonel.

He was Military Editor of Chambers Encyclopedia from 1938 to 1957 and became an authority on the history of land warfare. He was a contributor to the Dictionary of National Biography.

Burne lived in Kensington and his funeral was held at St Mary Abbots there.

== Inherent Military Probability ==
Burne introduced the concept of Inherent Military Probability (IMP) to the study of military history. He himself defined it thus :

My method here is to start with what appear to be undisputed facts, then to place myself in the shoes of each commander in turn, and to ask myself in each case what I would have done. This I call working on Inherent Military Probability. I then compare the resulting action with the existing record in order to see whether it discloses any incompatibility with the existing facts. If not, I then go on to the next debatable or obscure point in the battle and repeat the operation

More succinctly, John Keegan defined IMP as

The solution of an obscurity by an estimate of what a trained soldier would have done in the circumstances

== Bibliography ==
- The Royal Artillery Mess, Woolwich and its Surroundings (1935); abridged & revised as The Woolwich Mess (1954)
- Mesopotamia: The Last Phase (1936); revised 2nd edition (1938)
- Lee, Grant and Sherman (1938)
- The Art of War on Land (1944)
- Strategy as Exemplified in the Second World War (1946)
- The Noble Duke of York (1949)
- The Battlefields of England (1950)
- More Battlefields of England (1953)
- The Crecy War (1954)
- The Agincourt War (1956)
- A Military History of the First Civil War (1642-1646) (with Peter Young, 1959)
