= List of alumni of the University of York =

This is a list of alumni of the University of York, listed in alphabetical order by surname. The University of York, founded in 1963, has among its alumni many who have become notable, including at least twenty Members of the United Kingdom Parliament, five members of the House of Lords, two Members of the Scottish Parliament, one Member of the European Parliament and several ministers of non-UK governments. The university is also represented by alumni educated in the liberal arts such as English literature, social sciences, economics, philosophy, medieval history, and music. More recently, due to expansion into areas of technology, it has also produced notable computer scientists.

== A ==
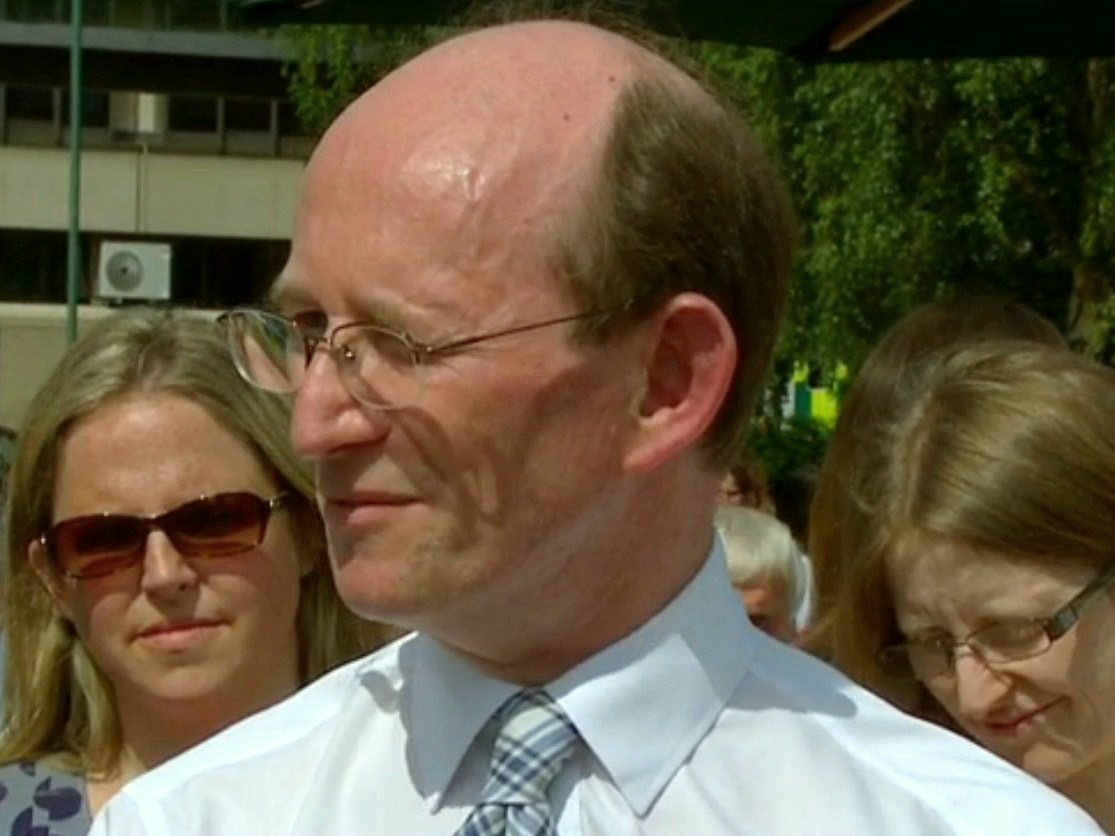
Edward Acton, former vice-chancellor of the University of East Anglia

- Lama Abu-Odeh, Palestinian American academic: MA, philosophy, 1989
- Daron Acemoglu, Turkish-born American economist,Nobel prize winner 2024, Professor at MIT: BA, Economics, 1989
- Edward Acton, historian and former vice-chancellor of the University of East Anglia : BA, History, 1971
- Mark Addis, philosopher: MSc, Computing
- Haleh Afshar, Baroness Afshar, cross-bench peer: BA, Politics, ?
- Geoffrey Álvarez, composer: D Phil, Composition
- Moniza Alvi, poet: BA, English
- Fleur Anderson, Labour MP for Putney: BSc, Politics, 1993; president of the Students Union, 1993–1994
- Kerry Andrew, composer and singer (Juice): BA, music, MA & PhD, composition
- Rollo Armstrong, musician (Faithless): BA, Philosophy & English, 1988
- Mohammad Hanif Atmar, Interior Minister of Afghanistan: Diploma Information Technology & MA Politics, 1997

== B ==
- Ian Bailey, author: BA, English/Anglo-Saxon, 1980
- Kevin Bailey, poet: BSc, Psychology, 1986
- Sally Baldwin, academic: Dip. Social Administration, & DPhil 1976?
- Tony Banks, Baron Stratford, MP: BA Politics, 1967
- Andrea Barber, actress
- Hugh Bayley, MP: BPhil, South African Studies, 1977
- Helen Bell, composer and musician: BA Music, 2001
- Steve Beresford, musician: BA music, 1970
- Denys Blakeway, television producer and author
- Mark William Bolland, journalist and publicist: BSc Chemistry 1987
- Anne Boyd, composer and professor of music: DPhil composition, 1972
- Keith Bradley, Baron Bradley, politician: MPhil Social Administration, 1979
- Stephen Brewster, professor of computer science: DPhil human-computer interaction, 1994
- Carole Bromley, poet
- Andrew Brons, MEP and former National Front leader: BA Politics, 1970
- Michael Brown, former MP and journalist
- Richard Burden, MP: BA politics 1978
- Kate Butch, drag queen and stand-up comedian
- Charles Butler, author: MSc Information Processing, 1989, DPhil English 1989
- Tanya Byron, child psychologist, author, TV presenter and Chancellor of Edge Hill University: BA Psychology, 1989

== C ==
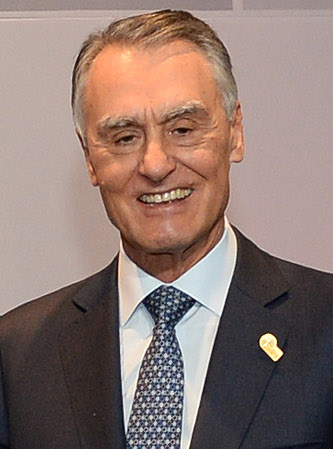
Aníbal Cavaco Silva, prime minister and president of Portugal

- James Callis, actor: BA English and Related Literature, 1993
- Matt Carter, General Secretary of the Labour Party: DPhil Politics, 1999
- Richard Causton, composer: BMus 1993, MA Composition 1994
- Aníbal Cavaco Silva, 11th Prime Minister and 21st President of Portugal: PhD Economics, 1973
- Horatio Clare, writer, radio producer and journalist: BA English & Related Literature, 1996
- Jane Clarke, Professor of Molecular Biophysics, University of Cambridge
- Myrna Combellack, writer, translator and academic: DPhil, English Literature, 1971
- David Conn, journalist and author: BA English literature & politics, 1986
- Richard Coyle, actor: BA Politics, 1994 or Languages and Philosophy, 1995
- Megan Crane, novelist: MA English Literature 1999, DPhil 2004
- Tim Crane, Knightbridge Professor of Philosophy, University of Cambridge: MA Philosophy, 1985
- Lee Cronin, chemist, nano-scientist: BSc Chemistry, 1994 & PhD, 1997

== D ==
- Ken Dark, archaeologist: BA Archaeology, 1982?
- Sara Davies, entrepreneur: Management, 2006
- Caroline Dean, plant scientist; group leader at the John Innes Centre: BA Biology, 1978 & DPhil, 1982
- Simon Ditchfield, Professor of Early Modern History: BA History, 1980
- Michael Dixon, director of the Natural History Museum: DPhil Zoology
- Chris d'Lacey, children's author: BSc biology, 1975?
- Michael Dobbs, US-based author: BA Economic & Social History, 1972
- Paul Dolan, behavioural scientist: MSc and D.Phil. economics, 1991 and 1997
- Michelle Donelan, former MP and Secretary of State for Digital, Culture, Media and Sport: BA History and Politics.
- Juraj Draxler, Education minister of Slovakia 2014–2016:MA Politics, 2005
- Duncan Druce, musician: MA music, 1985
- Helen Dunmore, writer: BA English, 1973
- Christopher Dye, epidemiologist, former Gresham Professor of Physic: Biology
- Greg Dyke, head of the Football Association and BFI; former director general of the BBC: BA politics, 1974

== E ==
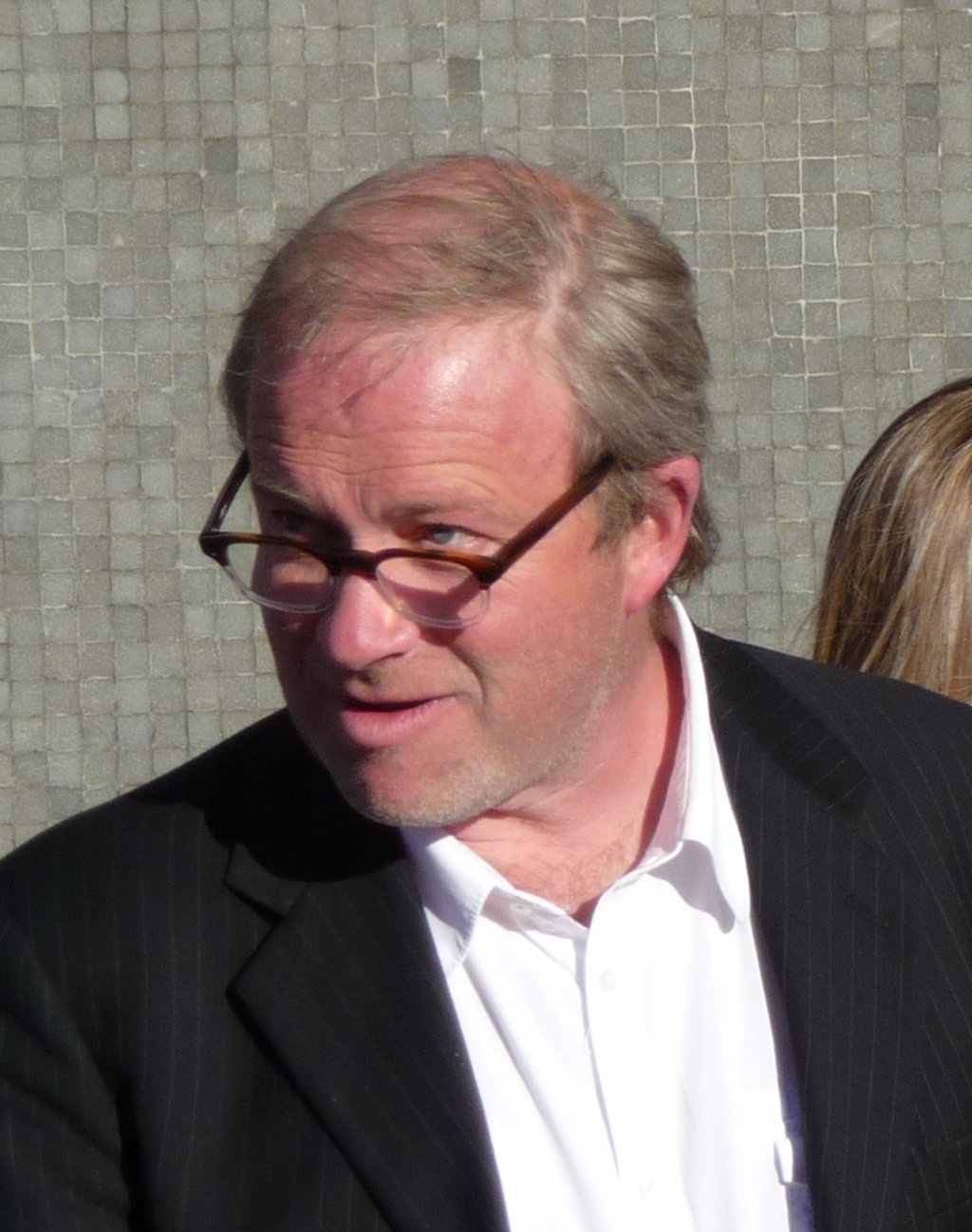
Harry Enfield, BAFTA award-winning comedian and actor

- Iain R. Edgar, social anthropologist: BA Philosophy, 1969
- Huw Edwards, MP for Monmouth
- Louise Ellman, MP for Liverpool Riverside: MPhil Social Administration, 1972
- Bryan Elsley, scriptwriter and creator of Skins: BA English & History, 1982
- Stephen Emmott, computer scientist: BSc Experimental Psychology, 1987
- Clive Emsley, historian and criminologist: BA History, 1966
- Harry Enfield, comedian: BA Politics, 1982

== F ==
- Jane Ferguson, journalist
- Steve Foots, Chief Executive of Croda International, BSc Chemistry
- Jay Foreman, musical comedian
- Christopher Fox, composer: DPhil composition, 1984
- Sir Lawrence Freedman, historian and political adviser, Professor of War Studies at King's College London: BPhil

== G ==
- Sean Gabb, libertarian academic: BA History, 1981
- David Gauntlett, sociologist: BA Sociology, 1992
- Sarah Gavron, film director: BA English, 1992
- Helen Geake, archaeologist: DPhil Archaeology, 1991?
- Roberta Gilchrist, archaeologist: DPhil Archaeology, 1989?
- Maurice Glasman, Baron Glasman, academic: MA Political Philosophy
- John Godfrey, composer: BA Music, 1983 & DPhil Composition, 1989
- Jeremy Goldberg, historian: MA History
- David Goodhart, journalist and writer: BA History and Politics, 1979
- Paul Goodman, MP: BA English Literature, 1981
- Peter Gordon, radio presenter
- David Graddol, linguist: BA Language/Linguistics, 1975 & Sociology, 1983
- Linda Grant, novelist and journalist: BA, English, 1975
- Michael Gray, author, authority on Bob Dylan: BA History and English Literature, 1967
- Jane Grenville, archaeologist and academic: PhD by publications, 2005
- Susanna Gross, journalist and newspaper editor
- William Owen "Will" Gregory, musician and producer

== H ==
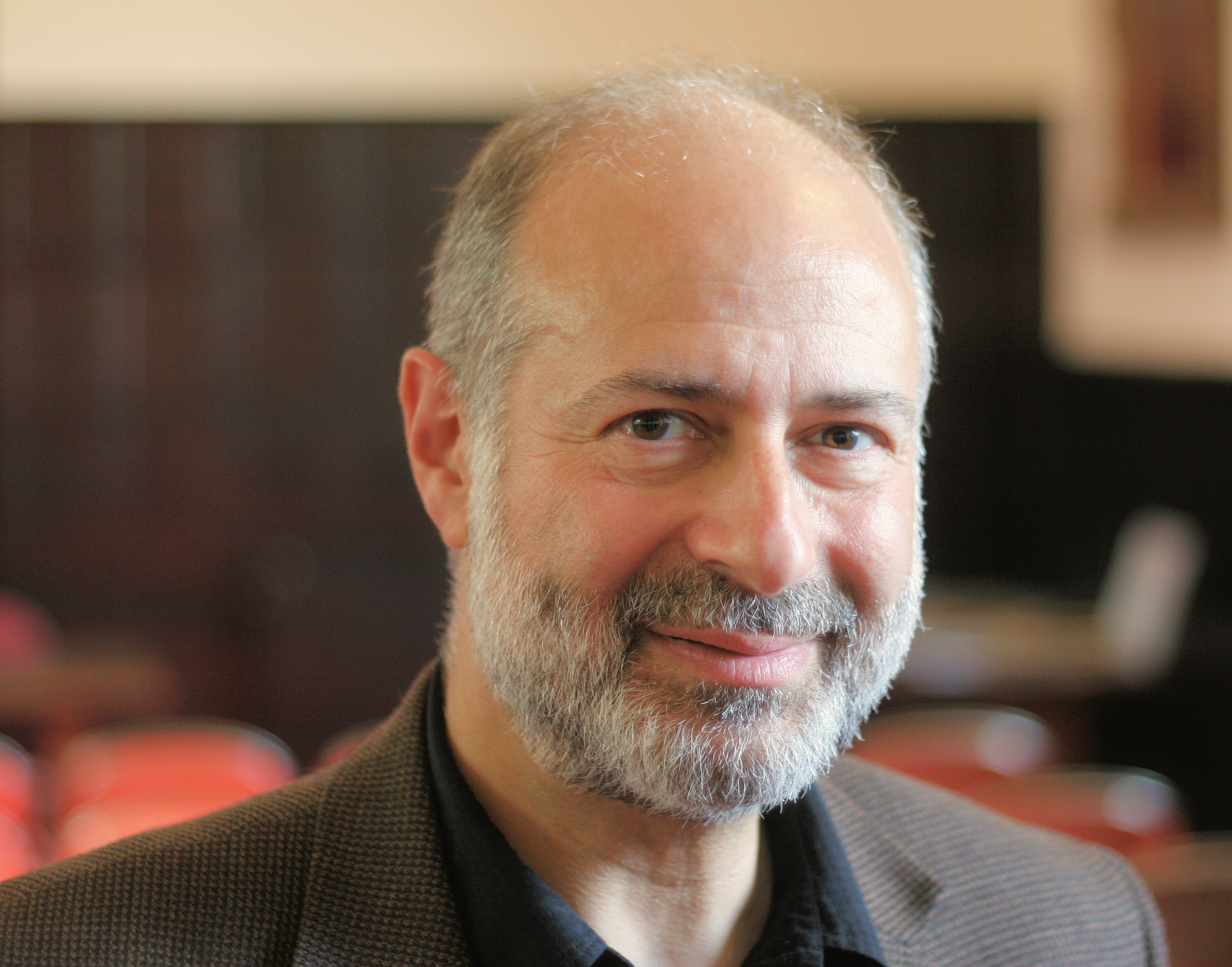
Fabian Hamilton, Labour Party MP

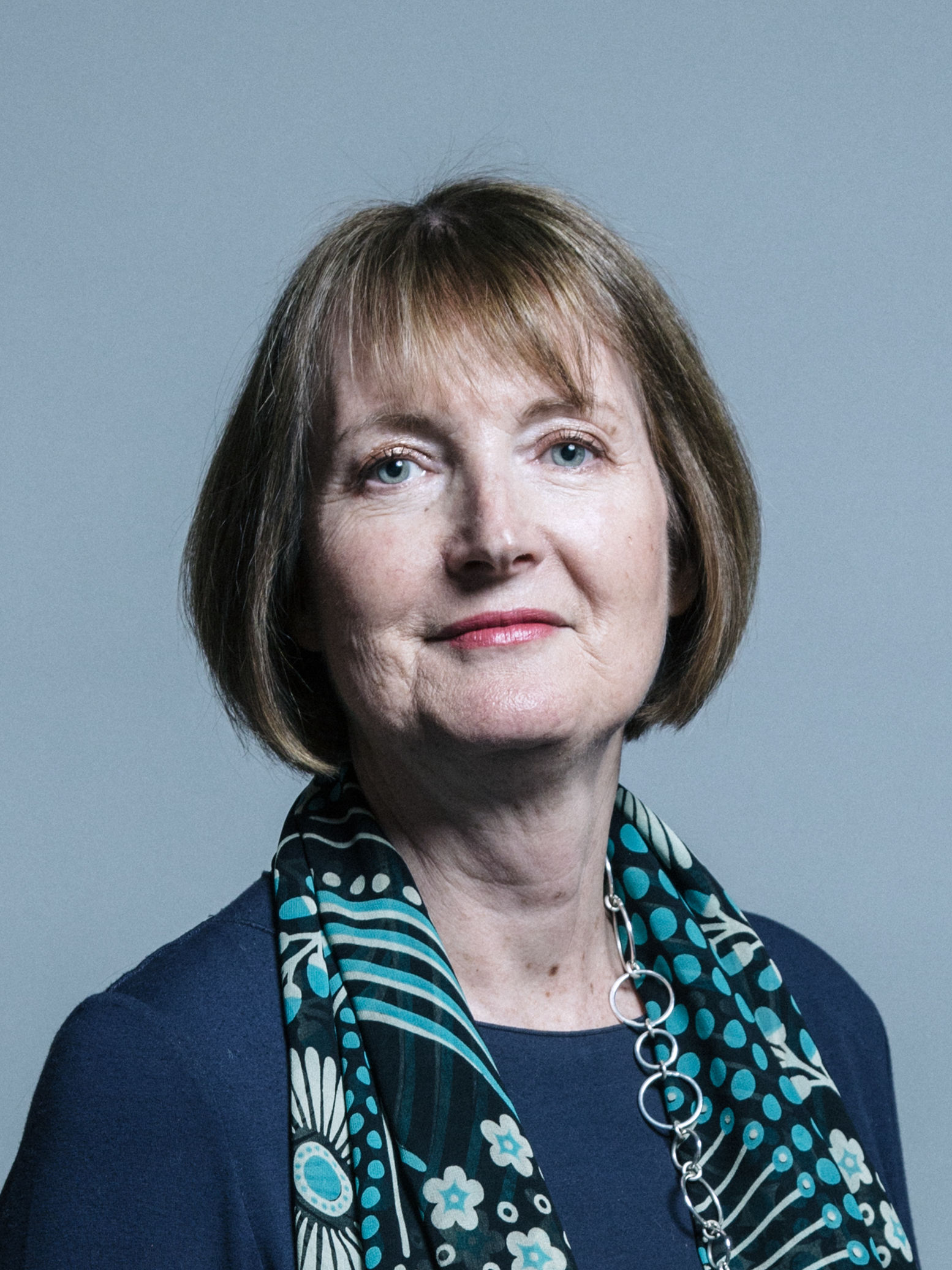
Harriet Harman, former MP for Camberwell and Peckham

- Emily Hall, composer: BMus, 1999?
- Christine Hamilton, television personality: BA Sociology, 1971?
- Fabian Hamilton, MP: BA Social Sciences
- Han Seung-soo, 39th Prime Minister of South Korea: DPhil Economics, 1968
- Andrew Harman, science fiction and fantasy author, game designer, co-creator of YAY Games : BSc Biochemistry
- Harriet Harman, MP, solicitor, Former Deputy Leader of the Labour Party: BA Politics, 1972
- Richard Harpin, businessman: Economics, 1986
- Patrick Harrex, musician: Music, 1968
- Tim Harries, bass player: BA Music, 1981
- Jonty Harrison, composer: DPhil Composition, 1980
- Miles Harrison, sports commentator: BA Politics and Economic & Social History, 1987
- Adam Hart-Davis, television producer and presenter: DPhil Chemistry, 1969
- Sue Hartley, Professor of Ecology: DPhil, Ecology
- Claire Hazelgrove, MP, BA Politics, 2010
- Joan Higgins, Professor of Health Policy: BA Social Administration, 1971
- Jimmy Hill, radio, television, and YouTube personality: BA History, 2009
- Rod Hills, politician and former leader of City of York Council.
- Jane Hillston, mathematician: BA Mathematics, 1985
- Robert Hingley, musician: BA Linguistics, 1978
- Peter Hitchens, journalist: BA Philosophy and Politics, 1973
- Patrick Holford, nutrition expert: BSc Psychology, 1976
- Martha Holmes, broadcaster: PhD Marine biology, 1988
- Paul Holmes, MP: BA History, 1978
- Sungji Hong, composer: PhD, musical composition, 2003
- Anthony Horowitz, author and screenwriter (Foyle's War): BA English, 1977

== J ==
- Stevi Jackson, professor of women's studies, University of York: BA Sociology 1973
- Lawrence James, author and journalist: BA English and History, 1966
- Greg Jenner public historian, author and podcaster: History and Archaeology, 2004
- Aled Gruffydd Jones, historian, Sir John Williams Professor of Welsh History at Aberystwyth University: BA History, 1977
- Trevor Jones, composer: BA Music, 1977 & MA Composition 1978
- Jung Chang, writer and historian: PhD linguistics, 1982
- Abdul Wahab Juned, politician and civil servant: MSc Biology and Biological education, 1983

== K ==
- Thomas Kariuki, biologist and Director of Programmes at the African Academy of Sciences : PhD, Immunology, 2004
- Brian Kennedy, journalist and LGBT rights activist : DPhil Biochemistry, 1974
- Ranjana Khanna, literary critic : BA English & Related Literature, 1988, DPhil 1993
- Oona King, Baroness King of Bow, former MP: BA Politics, 1990
- Panayiotis Kokoras, composer : MA, PhD, musical composition
- Yannis Kyriakides, composer: BA musicology, 1991.

== L ==
- Mark Laity, NATO spokesman, former BBC news reporter: BA, MA, 1977, 1978
- Philip Lawson, composer, singer (The King's Singers): BA, Music, 1979
- Clive Lawton, Founder of Limmud
- J. L. (Joanna) Laynesmith, historian: BA English/History, 1993 & DPhil Mediaeval History, 2000
- Ruth Lea, Baroness Lea of Lymm, economist: Economics and Statistics, 1969
- Carol Leader, actor: BA History 1971
- Phil Lester, YouTube vlogger and BBC Radio 1 DJ: BA English Language and Linguistics, 2008 & MA Postproduction with Visual Effects, 2009
- Andrew Lewin – Member of Parliament for Welwyn Hatfield since 2024, BA Politics, 2008
- Victor Lewis-Smith, comedian and writer
- Marina Lewycka, author: BPhil English Literature, 1970
- Tim Liardet, poet: BA History
- Chris Lilley, computer scientist: MSc Biological Computing, 1990
- Peter Lord, Oscar-nominated director of Aardman Animations: BA, English, 1976
- Emma Lowndes, actress: BA English, 1997?
- Zoe Lyons, comedian: Psychology, 1992

== M ==
- Phil Mac Giolla Bhain, journalist: BA Politics and Sociology
- Kevin Maguire, journalist: BA Politics
- Elleck Mashingaidze, Zimbabwean historian and diplomat: PhD
- Genista McIntosh, Baroness McIntosh of Hudnall, Labour Life Peer and theatre executive
- Grace McCleen, novelist: MA English Literature
- Des McNulty, politician and MSP: BA, Social science, 1974
- Gordon McPherson, composer: BA Music, 1986 & DPhil 1991
- Molly Meacher, Baroness Meacher: BA Economics, 1970
- Paul Mealor, composer: Music, 2002
- Farah Mendlesohn, writer and academic: DPhil History, 1997
- Anna Meredith, composer: Music
- Richard Middleton, musicologist: PhD Music
- Eduardo Reck Miranda, composer: MSc Music Technology, 1992
- Kathryn Mitchell, psychologist: Psychology
- Mahmoud Mohieldin, economist: MSc Economic & Social Policy Analysis, 1990
- Nicola Monaghan, novelist: BSc Mathematics, 1992
- Dominic Muldowney, composer: 1976
- Greg Mulholland, MP: BA, Politics, 1991 & MA Public Administration Policy, 1995
- Gráinne Mulvey, composer; Professor of Composition, Technological University of Dublin: DPhil in Music Composition, 1999
- Meg Munn, MP: BA, Language & Linguistics, 1981

== N ==
- Beverley Naidoo, South African children's writer : BA Education, 1968
- Atulya Nagar, mathematical physicist, academic and author: DPhil in Mathematics, 1996
- Ratish Nanda, Indian conservation architect : MA in Conservation Studies, 1998
- Glen Newey, academic and political philosopher : MA & DPhil Philosophy
- Michele Newman, television presenter : BA Economics, 1977
- Rebecca Newman, singer, songwriter: BA Philosophy, Politics and Economics, 2007

== O ==
- Rosemary O'Day (née Margaret Rosemary Brookes, now Englander), historian and author: BA History, 1967
- Denise O'Donoghue, television executive: BA Politics, 1979
- Waheed Omer, chief spokesperson for the President of Afghanistan: MA Political Science
- Albert Owen, MP: BA Politics, 1997
- Charlotte Owen, peer: BA Politics and International Relations, 2015

== P ==
- Miles Padgett, Professor of Physics: BSc
- Alvin Pang, poet: BA, English, 1994
- Lance Parkin, writer: BA English, 1994; MA English, 1995
- Joseph Pivato, academic & writer: BA English & French, 1970, PhD 1977 (Alberta) Prof. Athabasca University.
- Linda Porter, historian: BA History 1968 & DPhil 1973
- Anthony Powers, composer: DPhil Composition, 1976
- Harvey Proctor, MP 1979–1987: BA History
- Geoffrey K. Pullum, Professor of Linguistics: BA Language, 1972

== R ==
- Janina Ramirez, historian and TV presenter: PhD Art/Literature, 2006
- Sigrid Rausing, anthropologist and publisher: BA History, 1986
- Spencer Reece, American poet: MA English Literature
- John Richards, musician: DPhil Composition, 2002
- Steve Richards, television presenter and journalist: BA History, 1981
- Leen Ritmeyer, archaeologist: MA Conservation Studies
- Peter Robinson, poet: BA English, 1974
- Justina Robson, science fiction author : BA Philosophy and Linguistics
- Malcolm Rose, author: DPhil Chemistry
- Mark Russell, composer and radio presenter : BMus Music, 1982
- Sarah Russell, MP for Congleton: BA Politics, 2004
- Leon Rubin, international theatre director, professor

== S ==
- Sinan Savaskan, composer; PhD Music, 1997 *
- David Sawer, composer : BMus Music, 1982
- Severin Schwan, CEO of Hoffman-La Roche : Economics
- Tom Scott, YouTuber, presenter, web developer : Linguistics, English language, MA educational studies, 2009?
- Verity Sharp, Radio 3 and The Culture Show presenter : Music, 1992
- Neil Shephard, economist, Frank B. Baird, Jr Professor of Science, Harvard University: BA Economics/and Statistics, 1986
- Elizabeth Shields, MP for Ryedale : MA Medieval Studies
- Thomas Simaku, composer : DPhil 1996
- Jeanne Siméon, current Minister of Habitat, Lands, Infrastructure, and Land Transport in the Seychelles
- John Simpson, lexicographer, Chief Editor, Oxford English Dictionary 1993–2013 : BA English, 1975
- Rose Simpson, musician of the Incredible String Band : BA English, 1968
- Lindiwe Sisulu, South African politician : MA History & MPhil, 1989
- Beverley Skeggs, professor of sociology
- Jonathan Slater, Permanent Secretary, Department for Education
- Denis Smalley, composer : DPhil Composition, ?
- Chloe Smith, MP and Secretary of State for Work and Pensions: BA English, 2004?
- Brian Stableford, science fiction writer : BSc Biology, 1969, DPhil (not completed)
- William Graham Stanton, author : BA English & Related Literature, 1995
- Chris Steele-Perkins, photographer : Chemistry, 1966
- Simon Stephens, playwright : BA History, 1992
- Robert David Stevens, computer scientist : MSc Bioinformatics 1991 & DPhil 1996
- Rebecca Stott, novelist : BA English/Art History, 1986
- Jeremy Strong (author): BA English Literature, 1970
- Jonathan Stroud, author : BA English Literature, 1992
- Graham Swift, Booker Prize-winning author : DPhil 1973?

== T ==
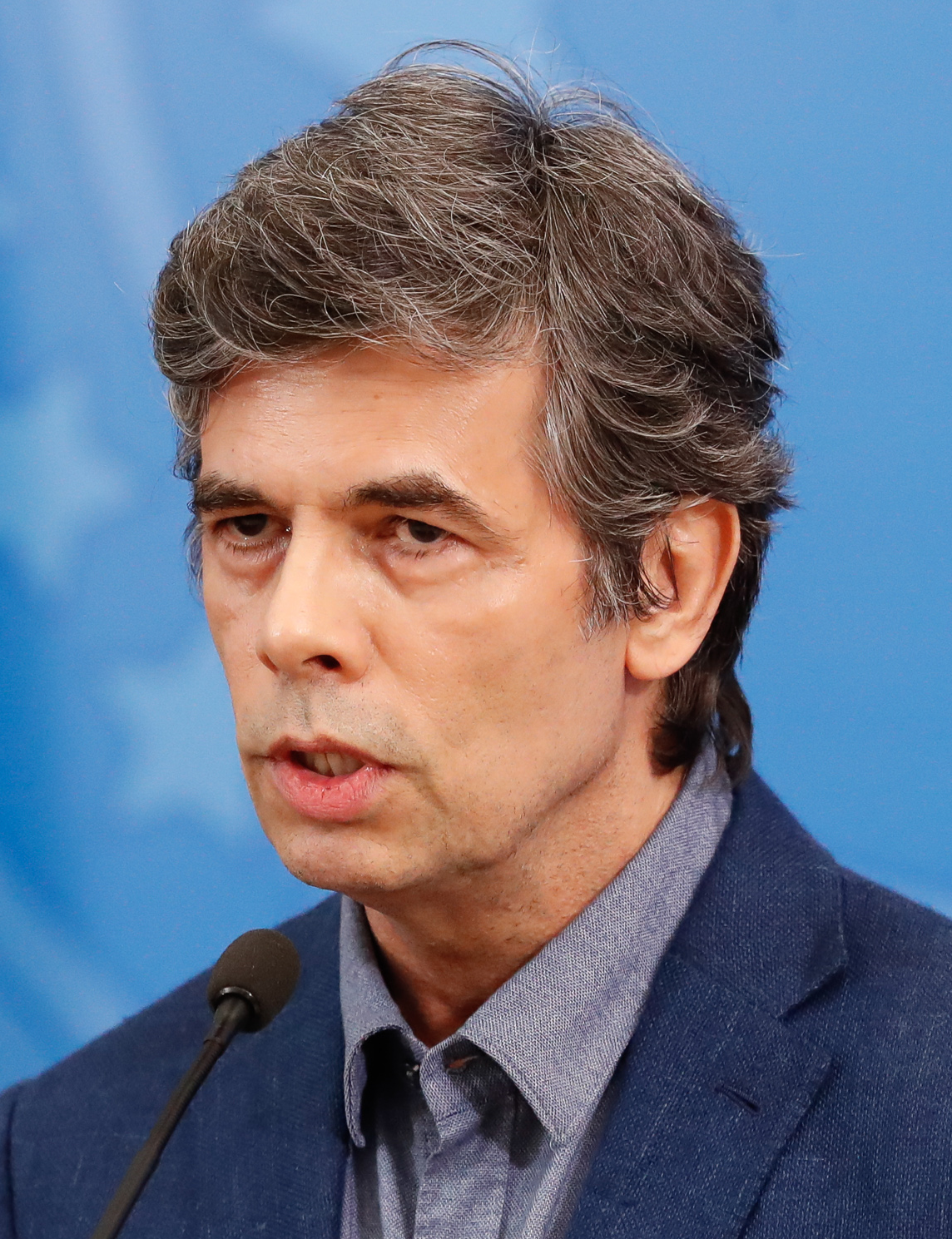
Nelson Teich, Brazil's Minister of Health

- Jeremy Tambling, British writer and critic
- Ellie Taylor, comedian and television presenter
- Nelson Teich, oncologist and Brazil's Minister of Health
- Caroline Thomson, former chief operating officer of the BBC : BA Economics and History

== V ==
- Phil Venables, computer scientist and member of the President's Council of Advisors on Science and Technology (PCAST)
- Vincenzo Visco, Italian economist and politician : MSc Economics, 1969

== W ==
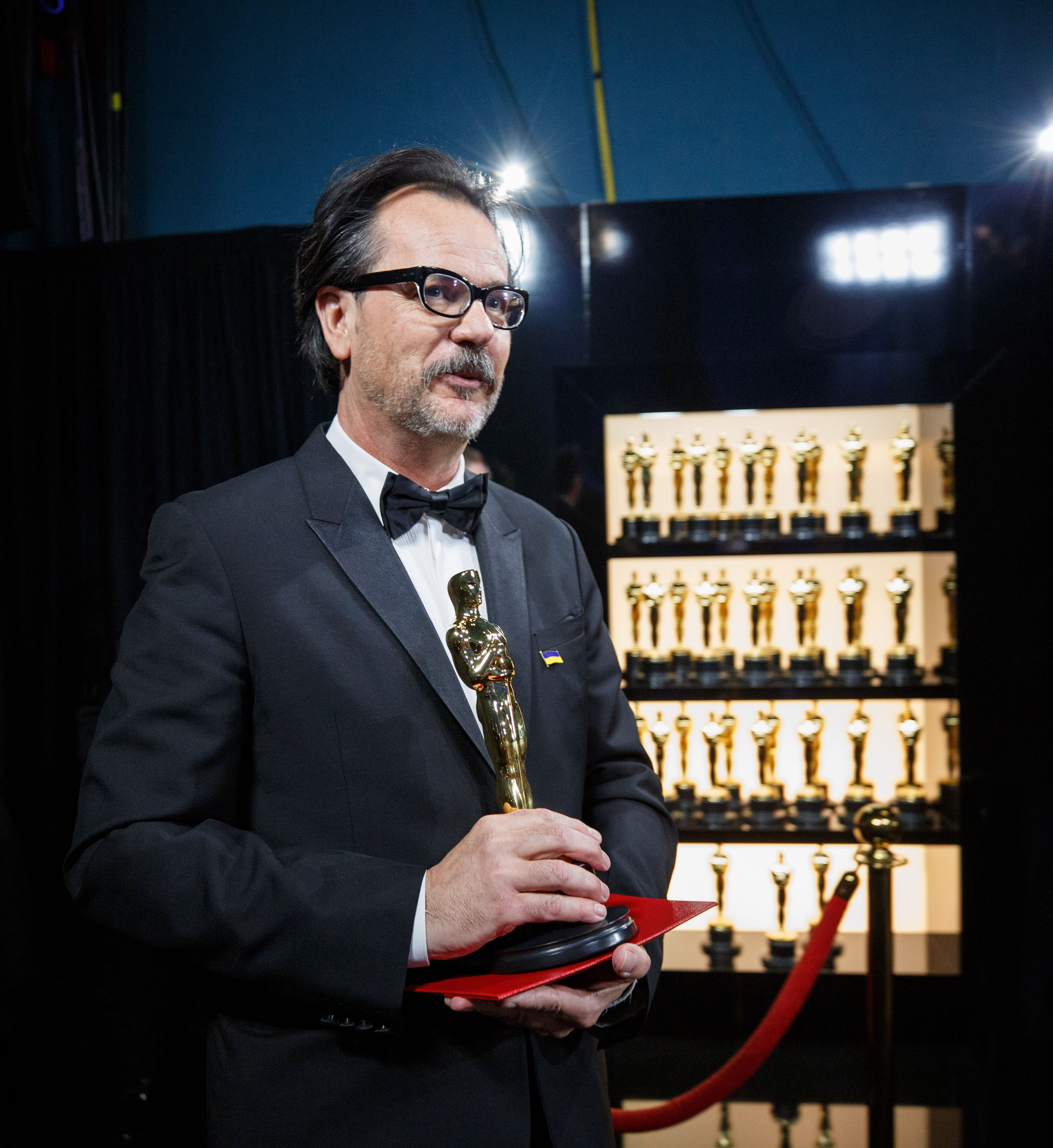
Joe Walker (film editor) at the 2022 Oscars Ceremony

- Sally Wainwright, playwright and television writer : BA English Literature and Creative Writing
- Joe Walker (film editor), Film Editor : BA Music, 1984
- Michael Wall, playwright : BA English, 1976
- Nicholas Wapshott, journalist and writer : BA Politics/Sociology, 1973
- Nicholas Watt, journalist: BA History, 1989
- Adrian Weale, author and journalist : BA History, 1985
- Andrew Webster, sociologist : DPhil Sociology, 1981
- Martin Wesley-Smith, composer : DPhil 1974
- Alex Wilson, musician : BEng Electronic & Computer Engineering, 1993
- Trevor Wishart, composer : DPhil Composition, 1973
- John Witherow, newspaper editor (Sunday Times) : BA History, 1975
- Gavin Wood, co-founder of Ethereum : MEng, 2002 & PhD, 2005
- Tony Worthington, MP
- Tim Wright, musician : PhD, 2013

== Y ==
- Steven Yearley, sociologist : PhD Sociology, 1981
- Yeung Sum, politician and former member of the Legislative Council of Hong Kong : MA Social Policy & Administration
- Sir Colville Norbert Young, Governor-General of Belize : DPhil Linguistics, 1973
- Michael Young, businessman and campaigner against apartheid : BA PPE, 1972
