= J. L. Laynesmith =

English medieval historian (born 1970)

J. L. Laynesmith FRHistS
- Born: Joanna L. Chamberlayne; 1970 (age 55–56)
- Spouse: Mark Laynesmith
- Children: 2

Academic background
- Education: University of York
- Thesis: English queenship, 1445-1503 (1999)
- Doctoral advisor: Felicity Riddy; Mark Ormrod

Academic work
- Discipline: History
- Sub-discipline: England in the Late Middle Ages; Gender history; Political history
- Institutions: Pembroke College, Oxford; University of York; University of Huddersfield; University of Reading

Joanna L. Laynesmith FRHistS (née Chamberlayne, born December 1970) is an English medieval historian, focusing on medieval queenship.

== Early life ==
Laynesmith was born in December 1970 to Judith and David Chamberlayne.

== Academic career ==
Laynesmith studied English and History at the University of York and went on to study for an MA on women in the late medieval world and DPhil on queenship in fifteenth-century England at the university's Centre for Medieval Studies, both funded by the British Academy. Her doctorate, titled English queenship, 1445-1503, was completed in 1999 and supervised by Felicity Riddy and Mark Ormrod.

After obtaining her doctorate, Laynesmith taught medieval history for two years at Pembroke College, Oxford and then taught briefly at the University of York and the University of Huddersfield. Following the birth of her first son she became a full-time parent but has remained active as a researcher. She is now a visiting research fellow at the University of Reading's Graduate Centre for Medieval Studies.

Laynesmith joined the Richard III Society in 1985 and co-founded its Worcestershire branch. From 2016 until 2021 she was the society's research officer and became the editor of its academic journal, The Ricardian, as well as a member of its board, in 2024.

== Research ==
Laynesmith's first monograph was published in 2004 by Oxford University Press. Titled The Last Medieval Queens: English Queenship 1445-1503, it was based on her doctoral thesis. C. S. L. Davies' review of the book for The English Historical Review noted that, although Laynesmith was covering "well-trodden" historical ground, her "cool appraisal of the evidence has enabled her to struggle free of the somewhat fanciful agenda she inherited from recent historians of medieval queenship, to good effect".

Laynesmith's second book, a biography of Cecily Neville, Duchess of York, was published by Bloomsbury in 2017. According to Barbara J. Harris in The American Historical Review, Laynesmith argued that Cecily "displayed a pragmatism bordering on ruthlessness" during her life at the centre of English politics.

Laynesmith has also co-edited numerous volumes of essays for the Queenship and Power series published by Palgrave Macmillan. Among them are Tudor and Stuart Consorts (2022); Hanoverian to Windsor Consorts (2023); Norman to Early Plantagenet Consorts (2023); and Later Plantagenet and the Wars of the Roses Consorts (2023). Laynesmith co-authored the latter volume's introduction with Elena Woodacre and contributed a chapter on Elizabeth Woodville. Michelle L. Beer praised the collection for its ability to "provoke new lines of inquiry and inspire the next generation of queenship studies".

Laynesmith's current research is focused on the politics of royal adultery in Britain between 500 and 1140.

=== Media work ===
Laynesmith has appeared in the 2013 BBC Two documentary The Real White Queen and Her Rivals, presented by Philippa Gregory, and in a 2018 episode of the BBC Radio 4 series In Our Time on Margaret of Anjou. She returned to In Our Time in 2026 for an episode on Lady Margaret Beaufort. She also appeared in a 2013 special of the Channel 4 archaeological series Time Team titled "1066: The Lost Battlefield".

=== Honours and awards ===
Laynesmith's book The Last Medieval Queens jointly won the Longman-History Today Book of the Year Prize in 2005 and the Women's History Network Book Prize in 2004. Her book Cecily Duchess of York won the 2018 Royal Studies Network Book Prize.

Laynesmith was elected a fellow of the Royal Historical Society in 2018.

Laynesmith and Iain Farrell won the Richard III Society's inaugural Jeremy Potter Award for their work organising the society's first annual school conference in 2022.

== Personal life ==
Laynesmith is married to the Reverend Mark Laynesmith (né Smith). They have two sons.

== Publications ==
=== Books ===
- Laynesmith, J. L. (2004). The Last Medieval Queens: English Queenship 1445-1503. Oxford University Press. ISBN 978-0-19-924737-0.
- Laynesmith, J. L. (13 July 2017). Cecily Duchess of York. Bloomsbury Publishing. ISBN 978-1-4742-7226-1.
- Aidan Norrie; Carolyn Harris; J. L. Laynesmith; Danna R. Messer; Elena Woodacre, eds. (2022). Tudor and Stuart Consorts: Power, Influence, and Dynasty. Cham: Palgrave Macmillan. ISBN 9783030951962.
- Aidan Norrie; Carolyn Harris; J. L. Laynesmith; Danna R. Messer; Elena Woodacre, eds. (2023). Norman to Early Plantagenet Consorts: Power, Influence, and Dynasty. Cham: Palgrave Macmillan. ISBN 9783031210679.
- Aidan Norrie; Carolyn Harris; J. L. Laynesmith; Danna R. Messer; Elena Woodacre, eds. (2023). Hanoverian to Windsor Consorts: Power, Influence, and Dynasty. Cham: Palgrave Macmillan. ISBN 9783031128288.
- Aidan Norrie; Carolyn Harris; J. L. Laynesmith; Danna R. Messer; Elena Woodacre, eds. (2023). Later Plantagenet and the Wars of the Roses Consorts: Power, Influence, and Dynasty. Cham: Palgrave Macmillan. ISBN 9783030948856.

=== Articles ===
- J. L. Laynesmith: "The Piety of Cecily, Duchess of York" - in The Yorkist Age: Proceedings of the 2011 Harlaxton Symposium (2013)
- J. L. Laynesmith: "The order, rules, and constructions of the house of the most excellent princess Cecily, duchess of York" - in Monarchy, State, and Political Culture in Late Medieval England: Essays in Honour of W. Mark Ormrod (2020)
