= John/Eleanor Rykener =

Medieval English sex worker

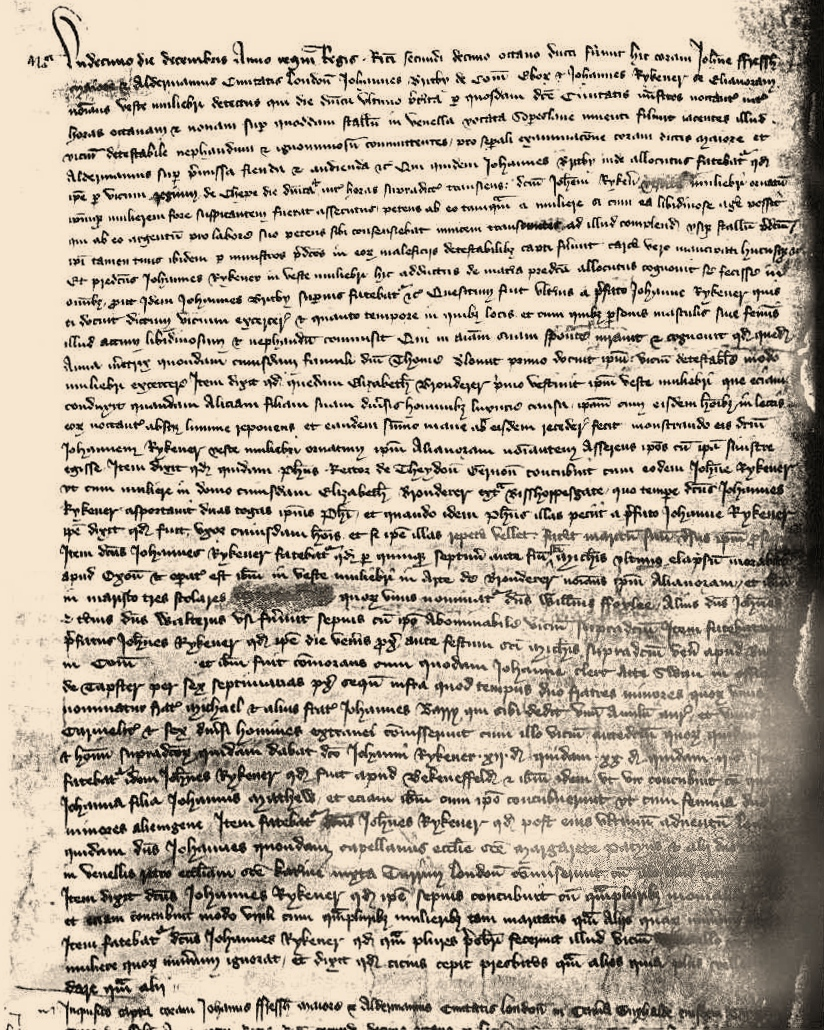
A scan of the first page of the notes from the interrogation of John/Eleanor Rykener at The Guildhall, London, in December 1394 – January 1395

John Rykener, also known as Eleanor, (Note: As the record of Rykener's interrogation begins: "Johannes Rykener, se Elianorum nominans veste muliebri detectus", or "John Rykener, calling [himself] Eleanor, having been detected in woman's clothing".) was a 14th-century gender-nonconforming male prostitute arrested in December 1394 for performing a sex act with John Britby, in London's Cheapside, while wearing female attire. Although historians tentatively link Rykener to a prisoner of the same name, the only known facts of Rykener's life come from an interrogation made by the mayor of London. Rykener was questioned on two offences: prostitution and sodomy. Prostitutes were not usually arrested in London during this period, while sodomy was an offence against morality rather than common law and so pursued in ecclesiastical courts. There is no evidence that Rykener was prosecuted for either crime.

Rykener spoke of being introduced to sexual contact with men by Elizabeth Brouderer, a London embroideress who dressed Rykener as a woman and may have acted as procurer. According to the court transcription of this account, Rykener had sex with both men and women, including priests and nuns. Rykener spent part of summer 1394 in Oxford, working both as a prostitute and as an embroideress, and in Beaconsfield had a sexual relationship with a woman. Rykener returned to London via Burford in Oxfordshire, working there as a barmaid and continuing with sex work. On returning to London, Rykener had paid encounters near the Tower of London, just outside the city. Rykener was arrested with Britby one Sunday evening in women's clothes, and was still wearing them during the interrogation on 11 December. There, Rykener described prior sexual encounters in great detail. But it appears that no charges were ever brought against Rykener; or at least, no records have been found suggesting so. Nothing definite is known of Rykener after this interrogation; Jeremy Goldberg has tentatively identified a John Rykener imprisoned by and escaping from the Bishop of London in 1399 as the same person.

Historians of social, sexual and gender history are especially interested in Rykener's case because of what it reveals about medieval views on sex and gender. Goldberg, for example, views it firmly in the context of King Richard II's quarrel with the city of London—although he has also questioned the veracity of the entire record and posited that the case was merely a propaganda piece by city officials. Historian James A. Schultz has viewed the affair as being of greater significance to historians than more famous medieval stories such as Tristan and Iseult. Ruth Mazo Karras—who in the 1990s rediscovered the Rykener case in the City of London archives—sees it as illustrating the difficulties the law has in addressing things it cannot describe. Modern interest in John/Eleanor Rykener has not been confined to academia. Rykener has appeared as a character in at least one work of popular historical fiction, and the story has been adapted for the stage. Rykener's persistent use of women's clothing and presentation as an embroideress, prostitute, or barmaid has prompted some contemporary scholars to suggest that Rykener was a trans woman.

== Background ==
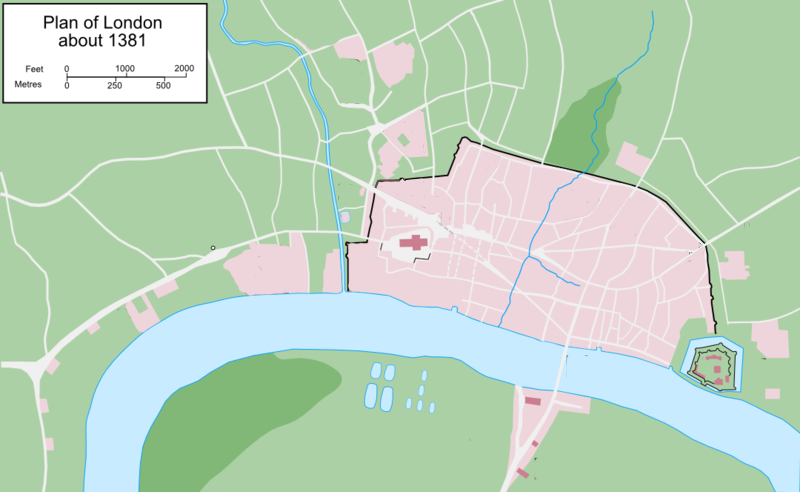
- London — red Oxford — green Beaconsfield — blue Bishop's Stortford gaol — brown Burford — orange The Guildhall — red Brouderer's house outside Bishopsgate — blue Gropecunt Lane — green Soper's Lane — yellow Southwark — pink St Katharine's by the Tower — purple

Prostitution was tightly regulated in fourteenth-century England, and brothels—although not prostitution itself—were illegal in the City of London. (Note: Brothels were legally permitted in three English towns—Southwark, Sandwich and Southampton. Prostitution had (officially) been prohibited in the city of London since 1267, and the prohibition re-promulgated regularly. As a result, says historian J. B. Post, Southwark—actually the London seat of the Bishops of Winchester—became "the principal brothel quarter of the metropolis".) City authorities tended not to prosecute individual sex workers, but focused on arresting the pimps and procuresses who lived off them. Prostitution was perceived as most dangerous to the moral fabric of society. Another sexual offence for which people could be prosecuted was sodomy, but this would generally be by the church in its own courts. Of these two sexual offences, sodomy was deemed the worse. The thirteenth-century philosopher and theologian Thomas Aquinas compared prostitution to a sewer controlling the flow of waste, saying that if one were to remove it, one would "fill the palace with foulness". Aquinas then expanded on the point, saying "take away prostitutes from the world and you will fill it with sodomy". Prostitution was thus seen as a necessary evil that, if not eliminated, could be controlled. The Lord Mayor of London's secular court would not have been seen as competent to hear cases involving either offence.

In late-fourteenth-century London, it was considered socially unacceptable for a man to habitually wear women's clothes. There were exceptions if it was deliberately obvious or necessary—for example, in theatre, or mystery plays. (Note: The latter are an example of a situation where male-to-female transvestitism was effectively enjoined upon the participants, as they were often monks or members of a religious community that had no women to take part. Even where secular troupes performed mystery plays, it was still "not considered proper for a woman to exhibit herself, and in most of the plays men kept a monopoly". A near-contemporary (but possibly apocryphal) European crossdresser was Ulrich von Lichtenstein, a Styrian knight who rode across Europe dressed as a woman and taking part in tourneys.) Corpus Christi mystery plays, as the historian Katie Normington notes, provided an occasion "where gender identity could be tested or disrupted". Conversely, the limited number of such opportunities, says Vern Bullough, meant that male-to-female transvestism was effectively non-existent in public society. But beneath the surface, suggests Ruth Evans, London was "a place of unrivalled sexual and economic opportunities".

Hermaphroditism too had a legally recognised status; the thirteenth-century jurist Henry de Bracton, for example, had discussed it in his Laws and Customs of England, and there was a strong tradition of fictionalising it. The best-known, a story told by at least four separate German chroniclers in the 1380s, was from Lübeck. The protagonist dressed as a woman by night and sold sex out of a booth. By day, he was a priest and was eventually discovered when a client recognised him celebrating mass. The medieval historian Jeremy Goldberg has compared the Lübeck and Rykener cases: both involved "cross-dressing, dishonesty, the close association of priests with homosexual activity, and the eventual intervention of the city authorities".

== Life ==
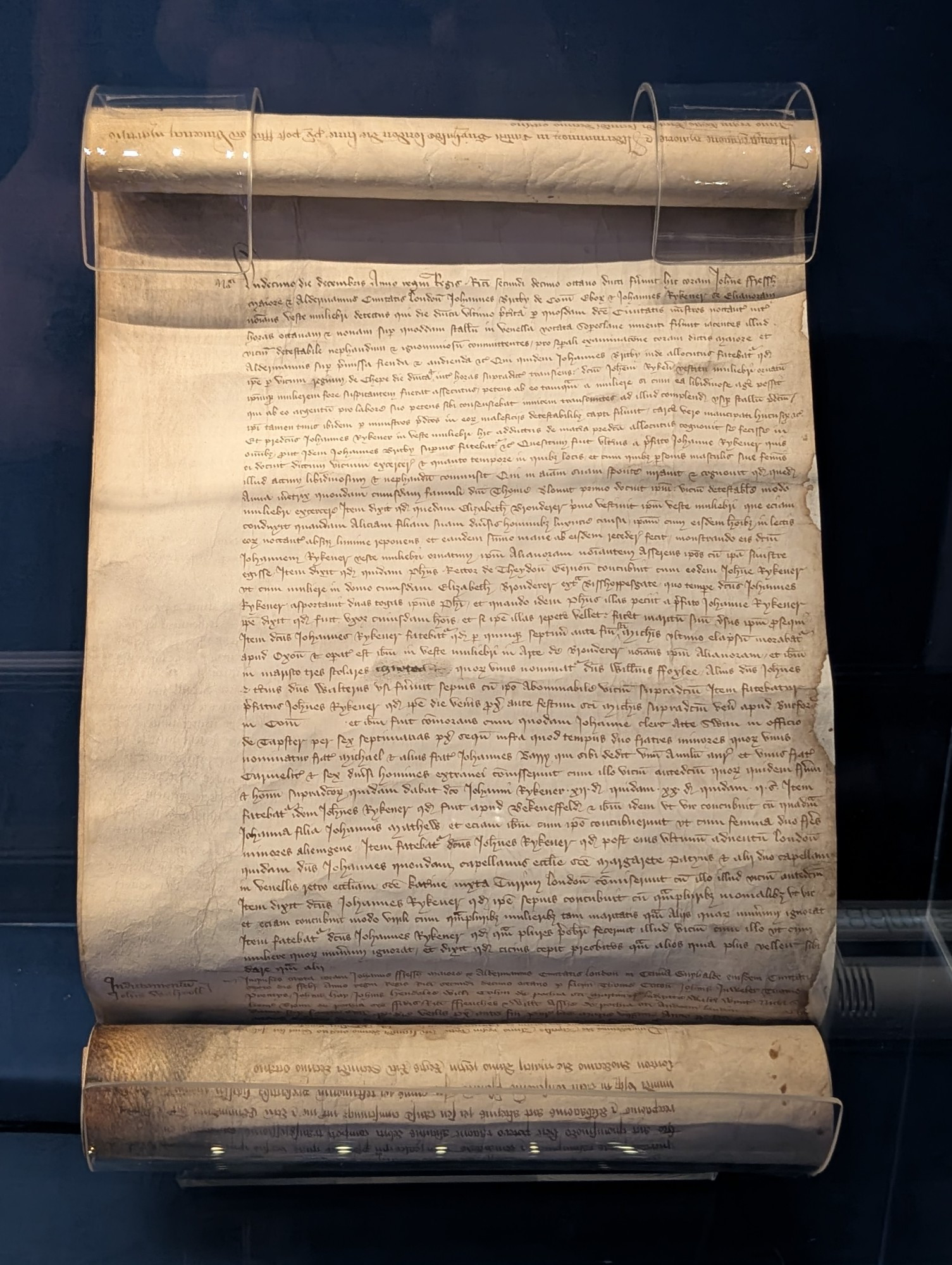
Court records containing Rykener's interrogation, London (England), 11 December, 1394 (The London Archives, City of London Corporation, Plea and Memoranda Roll A34 [1395]). On display at the British Library's exhibition Medieval Women: In Their Own Words (25 October - 2 March 2025). Photograph: Alicia Spencer-Hall (24 February 2025).

All that is known of Rykener's life comes from the answers given during the interrogation in the Lord Mayor's court, following Rykener's arrest in December 1394. At these proceedings, Rykener described in some detail coming to learn the trades of prostitution and needlecraft when living with a London embroideress, also telling the court with whom and where Rykener subsequently plied those trades. According to the transcription of the proceedings, Rykener had only recently returned to London after visiting other parts of southern England prior to being arrested in Cheapside, a busy commercial district of London. (Note: Jeremy Goldberg has described Rykener's Cheapside thus: "Soper Lane is one of a number of narrow streets that open off Cheapside. Historically associated with the Guild of Pepperers, by the late fourteenth century, it was occupied by Mercers, Drapers, and Fishmongers. Some shops appear to have been run down by this date. The narrow lanes opening off the south side of Cheapside had a long association with prostitution, suggested by the names of the nearby Gropecunt and Popkirtle Lanes". Soper Lane was enlarged and renamed Queen Street after the destruction of the original thoroughfare in the Great Fire of London. Goldberg has also tentatively identified John Britby as the man by that name who was a (possibly royal) clerk in 1384. By 1410 this Britby was vicar of Stanton.)

=== At Elizabeth Brouderer's house ===
At the interrogation, Rykener described being first dressed as a woman at the Bishopsgate house of one Elizabeth Brouderer. (Note: Nine years earlier, around 1385, Elizabeth Brouderer (under her real surname, rather than by-name, of Moryng) had been operating a prostitution racket disguised as a legitimate embroidery business. She was convicted of pimping. She had employed "young and vulnerable" girls as apprentice embroiderers, only to then prostitute them out. During this interrogation, Rykener gave the Mayor and officials an example of this, describing how Brouderer had had a maid called Joan, whom Brouderer had made sleep with a priest for two nights, "under the pretext of lighting his way home". Joan's story comes from Brouderer's 1385 interrogation. Taken on as an apprentice, Joan was instructed to "... go with the said chaplain to his chamber to carry a lantern for him ... with the intention that the said Joan would spend the night there" says the interrogation record. But, comments Karras, "Joan does not seem to have understood what was expected of her" and neither did she "even seem to understand the essentials of her trade"; Brouderer may not have explained Joan's job to her. Joan stayed a night and a day with the chaplain, but she did not sleep with him and thus was not paid. "For this the said Elizabeth reproached her", continues the record, and Joan was sent back the following night to "take whatever she could get for her work". This time, Joan stole a breviary, which Morying sold for eightpence. Morying had been living in All Hallows-on-the-Wall parish at the time of her offence but was expelled from the city following her conviction. Her house in Bishopsgate was, therefore, outside—possibly only by a hundred yards or so—the city walls. What little is known of Elizabeth Morying prior to Rykener's arrest comes from a city Inquisition of July 1385 investigating allegations that she was a procuress. Here it was mentioned that she had a husband, one Henry, who may have aided her in her trade.) Following the 1348–1349 outbreak of bubonic plague (Note: The Black Death had originally entered England in 1348, and is estimated to have killed between 40% and 60% or the population. It returned in 1361, with a mortality rate of 20% including 1,200 people in London in two days alone (24–25 June 1361).)—which killed between one quarter and one half of the English population—female apprenticeships had become as common as those for boys, particularly in London. Here Rykener was taught how to sleep with men as a woman and to be paid for doing so, as well as embroidery, and may have completed an apprenticeship under Brouderer, as female apprentices did. Rykener described the situation in some detail:

He further said that a certain Elizabeth Bronderer first dressed him in women's clothing; she also brought her daughter Alice to diverse men for the sake of lust, placing her with those men in their beds at night without light, making her leave early in the morning and showing them the said John Rykener dressed up in women's clothing, calling him Eleanor and saying that they had misbehaved with her. He further said that certain Phillip, Rector of Theydon Garnon, had sex with him as with a woman in Elizabeth Bronderer's house outside Bishopsgate, at which time Rykener took away two gowns of Phillip', and when Phillip requested them from Rykener he said that he was the wife of a certain man and that if Phillip wished to ask for them back he would make his husband bring suit against him.

The sex lessons, Rykener explained, were so that Brouderer could give her daughter, Alice, to men at night, while it was dark so they could not see her. Alice would then leave her client before daybreak, and Brouderer would tell the man that he had slept with Rykener. Rykener would be present in front of the client, wearing women's clothes and called Eleanor by Brouderer. One of the men Rykener had intercourse with in Brouderer's house was the Rector of Theydon Garnon, called Philip. After having sex with the Rector, Rykener stole two gowns from him. The latter gave up trying to retrieve his property when Rykener told Philip that Rykener was the wife of an important man in the city. This would have forced the Rector to sue Rykener's supposed husband in court for the return of Philip's property. (Note: A court case would have forced the rector to reveal what he and Rykener had been doing. It was a not impossible scenario: there is at least one documented case in which a prostitute called Emma Northercote sued her client—a priest—for non-payment of services.) Brouderer's motives in using Rykener this way have been the subject of speculation among scholars. John Roxeth, considering Brouderer's treatment of Rector Philip, has suggested that she used Rykener to blackmail men, although he does not extrapolate on the mechanics of her doing so. Roxeth's theory is not universally accepted; Jeremy Goldberg, for instance, notes Roxeth's suggestion without commenting on its probability, while Ruth Karras considers Rykener to have merely been prostituted in the usual fashion.

=== Oxford and return to London, mid-1394 ===
By August 1394, (Note: The month is adduced by the fact that Rykener spoke of living in Oxford "for five weeks before the feast of St Michael's", the latter date, Michaelmas, being 29 September.) Rykener had moved to Oxford, continuing with sex work but also obtaining work as an embroideress: Brouderer had clearly been successful at teaching her protégé both trades. Among Rykener's sexual clients were, Rykener said, "three unsuspecting scholars", or "scolares ignotos", whom Rykener named as three knights, Sir William Foxley, a Sir John and a Sir Walter. (Note: Most of Rykener's clients are unidentifiable. Goldberg has suggested that Sir William Foxley is William Foxlee, a chaplain of New College, Oxford between 1410 and 1411. The fact that they were titled "Sir" did not necessarily indicate that they were laymen of the knightly class; the Latin used is dominus, and this was also a courtesy title for a priest. The names of a number of rectors of Theydon Garnon are known, but there is no Phillip recorded for the relevant date. Rykener's other clients, says Goldberg, are "at best names".) They may not have known Rykener's birth sex, and the recorder's phrasing is ambiguous. The three knights had used Rykener's services frequently. The historian Carolyn Dinshaw has questioned whether their ignorance of Rykener's sex could have lasted for the duration of the sojourn. More likely, she suggests, at some point they realised—and continued. Rykener encouraged a wealthy, often ecclesiastical clientele, in both professions. The upper classes employed embroiderers, especially the clergy with their ecclesiastical vestments. A seamstress, by contrast, was almost strictly proletarian.

In September 1394, Rykener moved west to Burford and lived with the innkeeper John Clerk, working for him as a barmaid. (Note: Cordelia Beattie has drawn attention to the fact that "while men could embroider and sell ale, these are both occupations usually practised by women in late medieval England". Further, tapsters, as a trade, were seen as particularly prone to sexual promiscuity and licentiousness. In Chaucer's The Miller's Tale, for example, the narrator tells how a parish clerk took advantage of their favours during drinking sessions: "In al the toun nas brewhous ne taverne / That he ne visited with his solas / Ther any gaylard tappestere was. / But sooth to seyn, he was somdeel squaymous / Of fartyng, and of speche daungerous." ("In all the town there was no brew house nor tavern / That he did not visit with his entertainment, / Where any merry barmaid was. / But to say the truth, he was somewhat squeamish / About farting, and fastidious in his speech.")) Rykener's clients at this time included two Franciscan friars, Brother John and Brother Michael, the latter of whom paid with a gold ring. Other customers included a Carmelite friar and six foreigners. Three of the latter paid Rykener, respectively, twelve pence, twenty pence, and "as much as two shillings for a single encounter". (Note: This was a large amount; to put these figures into a contemporary context, Michael Postan has estimated the daily wages of those in skilled trades—carpenters, tilers, thatchers and masons, for example—during the same decade as averaging far less: 4s. 13d., 4d., 3s. 07d. and 4d. respectively.) Rykener's stay in Burford seems to have been brief, and it was not long before Rykener was in Beaconsfield. Rykener did not only sleep with men as a woman; while in Burford, Rykener had a sexual relationship as a man with a woman called Joan Matthew. For encounters with women, Rykener took no payment, or, at least, did not mention taking any. Rykener also continued sex work in Beaconsfield, this time with two more (foreign) Franciscans.

Rykener returned to London later in the year and claimed to have, since doing so, had an encounter with a Sir John, whom Rykener said had once been chaplain at St Margaret Pattens. Rykener also met two other chaplains, whom became customers, in the back streets of St Katharine's by the Tower. (Note: This was a popular area for sex work (and general thievery) in the late fourteenth century. A contemporaneous report described it as "a resort for thieves and women of evil life".) Whether Rykener's clients wanted a man or a woman is unknown. Britby and Rykener were arrested later in Cheapside. Britby claimed to have been looking for a woman, but Dinshaw believed that, given he was under arrest at the time, he was hardly likely to say otherwise. Another client, Theydon Garnon's rector, also seems to have wanted a woman, and was never told otherwise.

=== Arrest ===
On the Sunday before Rykener's meeting with the mayor, between 8 and 9 o'clock in the evening, Rykener was by Soper Lane, off Cheapside, and looking—as Dinshaw phrases it—"woman enough" to attract the attention of the Yorkshireman John Britby. According to Rykener, Britby propositioned Rykener in Cheapside, and they went to Soper Lane. They also caught the attention of "certain officers of the city", who arrested them. They were accused of "lying by a certain stall in Soper's Lane, committing that detestable unmentionable and ignominious vice". (Note: This "suggestively reticent turn of phrase" is the writing of the recording clerk. Such florid language was common in the description of people and acts deemed illegal or immoral by the courts. Prostitution, for example, was regularly referred to as "'the stinking and horrible sin of lechery', practised by strumpets", even in the official city ordinances.) Rykener was arrested in women's clothes and interrogated in them, and told the mayor and officials that the name "Eleanor" was used for work. (Note: Eleanor was an uncommon name by the fourteenth century, and considered an upper-class one; as such, its use by Rykener could have been intended to be socially satirical. The name was sufficiently uncommon that in a study of names from the 1381 poll tax, Sarah Uckelman found only one Eleanor for the whole county of Suffolk.) The "unmentionable" act they were accused of committing, suggests Jeremy Goldberg, was presumably anal sex. (Note: It is never described literally; rather, the euphemisms used were "illud vitium detesyable, nephandum, et ignominiosum", with Rykener "ut cum mulier", or "that detestable, unmentionable, and ignominious vice ... as a woman". As Victoria Blud has pointed out, the fact that the scribe found it unmentionable makes it hard for the later reader to place a label upon the act at all.) There can be no certainty on this point, as, Goldberg has pointed out, the clerk's language often consists of what Goldberg labels "knowingly opaque circumlocution". Rykener and Britby were interrogated separately by the mayor, John Fresshe, and the collected aldermen of the common council. The precise date of the interrogations is unknown; the original document in the Common Council's Plea and Memoranda Rolls (itself, says Goldberg, only kept in a "rather loose chronological order") can be dated only by its position immediately preceding a plaint regarding a property dispute on 26 January 1395.

Britby said that he was passing through Cheapside when he met Rykener, and acknowledged that he propositioned Rykener. Britby claimed to have done so in the belief that he was talking to a woman. (Note: He may well have been honestly misled; Cordelia Beattie too has commented upon the fact that "from other incidents Rykener recalls, it is evident that while wearing women's clothes he could pass as a woman".) Either way, Rykener had agreed to sex with him and named a price, which he agreed to pay. Rykener confirmed this story. The rest of it, the officials knew: caught in the act by the local watch, Rykener and Britby had been taken away and imprisoned. Rykener, asked where the idea for such work came from, said that "a certain Anna, the whore of a former servant of Sir Thomas Blount" had taught him to act as a woman, (Note: Anna, the prostitute from whom Rykener learned much, was probably a foreigner, says Goldberg. Anna was also a relatively rare name in England, less so in the Low Countries. Of all the unknown and vaguely-outlined personages involved in Rykener's story, hers is, he suggests, "a plausible identity. Several of the women working as employees of the Southwark stews—in effect brothels—according to the 1381 poll tax returns were given the rather significant second name of Frowe, a version of the Dutch word for woman". J. B. Post has also noted that the poll tax returns of 1380 indicate many of the bordellos employed foreign female servants and that there were complaints of a Flemish monopoly in Southwark.) and that Elizabeth Brouderer first dressed him so. (Note: Regarding pronouns, the source places square brackets where the original Latin refers to Rykener in an indeterminate gender, "or where we supply a pronoun that the Latin omits"; where the Latin specifies a gender, so does the translation. Karras and Boyd noted that "the feminine is only used twice to refer to Rykener, both in indirect speech".)

Besides the encounter in question, Rykener spoke of having sex as a man "with many nuns", and as woman with an Essex rector, three Oxford scholars, four Franciscans, one Carmelite, three chaplains and many priests.

— Victoria Blud

Medieval English legal investigation was inquisitorial, with facts established through question and answer. Rykener's answers were given in English but transcribed into Latin for the record. Thus the account, as recorded, was not a personal confession, but rather conveyed the sense, possibly a gloss, of what Rykener intended. Such questioning, believe Karras and Boyd, would have been a particularly "'heavy burden' for Rykener to bear alone". Rykener also told the mayor and aldermen about having frequently had sexual intercourse with women as a man. Rykener was uncertain, when asked, whether the women were married or not, but they included nuns: "how many he did not know". Rykener's responses suggest that officialdom was particularly concerned with the moral question of adulterous married women and sexually active religieuses. Rykener told them that these encounters, whether with men or women, occurred in taverns, public places, and private houses. Whatever the mayor and his colleagues intended, most—if not everything—of what Rykener told them was beyond their court's jurisdiction. Goldberg notes how the scribal clerks went to great trouble to record extraneous, background material that took place many miles outside that jurisdiction.

Britby began his interrogation supposedly unaware of Rykener's birth sex, but he was aware by the end of it. Carolyn Dinshaw has suggested that this may indicate that "they hadn't really gotten started in that libidinous act" at the point they were arrested, so Britby had not had a chance to find out. Britby does not appear to have been charged with a crime. The one thing Rykener could have been charged with, fornication, would have had to be prosecuted in an ecclesiastical court, and so was also beyond the mayoral court's jurisdiction. Prostitutes were generally not prosecuted in the mayoral court. Perhaps Rykener was sufficiently different to warrant their notice, being after all "no poor young woman forced or tricked into selling her body in order to get by, the pawn of the pimp or procurer who controlled her, nor was he offering vaginal sex". If Rykener was charged with any offence, the outcome of the case is unknown. There is not, says Goldberg, any "further record of any response or action on the part of the court nor any further notice of Rykener". There are no explicit charges, verdict or sentence. Contemporaries understood a prostitute was not just a woman who took money for sex, but a sinful woman. Therefore, even if a man took money for sex, which is likely how Rykener would have been perceived, they could not be—to the medieval mind—a prostitute, and so could not be prosecuted as one. If Rykener was eventually released after interrogation but without charge, it may have been because the mayor and aldermen of London "did not quite know what to make of him". Indeed, it was extremely unusual for a case like Rykener's to be heard in a mayoral court in the first place. It is not clear what form of legal process was followed. There may have been some confusion among the interrogators regarding how Rykener was to be dealt with: sodomy was beyond the court's jurisdiction.

== Political context and later events ==
[Rykener] said that he accommodated priests more readily than other people because they wished to give him more than others.

— Ruth Karras and David Boyd

Rykener disappeared from historical records after the interrogation, with nothing certain known of the sex worker's later life. The name itself is sufficiently unusual to have allowed researchers to speculate. Jeremy Goldberg tentatively identified Rykener as the John Rykener who was imprisoned in the Bishop of London's gaol in Bishop's Stortford, and who escaped in 1399. The reason for this person's imprisonment is unknown. That he fell under episcopal jurisdiction suggests he had ecclesiastical status, most probably being an ecclesiastical clerk. (Note: There were at least three Rykeners in late fourteenth-century England, two called John, who according to Goldberg may have been the same person; one of these was presumably Eleanor. Apart from the escaping clerk, there was a John Rykener of Bengeo, in Hertfordshire; the proximity of this John to Bishop's Stortford may mean that this John and the clerk are in fact the same. The only other Rykener at all was one William Rykener, a monk of Winchester Cathedral Priory in 1382. Occupational surnames being so common in the English middle ages, Goldberg suggested Rykener was a corruption of Reckoner. In other words, one who reckons, or tallies-up: "precisely the kind of office a secular clerk might perform".) In this gaol, most prisoners were convicted clerks. If this is the same John Rykener, imprisonment in Bishop's Stortford would not have been for the same offences Rykener was questioned for in 1394: having sexual relations would not get a bishop's clerk imprisoned. Contemporary records report nothing of this Rykener's background or events after the escape. There was an investigation, but this focused on the Bishop of London's poor record in keeping his prisoners secure rather than on the individuals themselves. (Note: There were, notes Goldberg, a number of prisoner escapes from the gaol under Bishop Robert Braybrooke's tenure.)

John/Eleanor Rykener's arrest and interrogation took place at the height of the spread of Lollardy. (Note: Lollards followed the religious teachings of John Wycliffe, a late fourteenth-century dissident of the church. He especially attacked the privileged status of the clergy and advocated a translation of the Bible from Latin into the vernacular. His enemies accused him of predestination and iconoclasm. During his later life Wycliffe received the personal protection and patronage of King Richard's uncle John, Duke of Lancaster. When the church itself descended into schism in the 1380s, Wycliffe's teachings were outlawed after his death in 1384. Enforcement of the ban on Lollardy by both church and state was intermittent, however, and the movement increased in size and organisation into the mid-fifteenth century.) Lollardism was deemed heresy, and it was only a few weeks after Rykener's arrest that its followers promulgated their Twelve Conclusions. The Rykener case, comments Dinshaw, must have been "like a nightmare of the Lollard imagination", consisting as it did of a "cross-dressed prostitute who had had sex with so many clerics s/he couldn't remember them all confirm[ing] the Lollards' lowest expectations of the prelacy". The third of the Lollards' twelve conclusions specifically addressed the question of clerical sodomy, which Lollardism blamed on the church's insistence on priestly abstinence.

The mayor too may also have had political reasons for bringing Rykener before the Bench. Doing so allowed him to demonstrate his commitment to strong law and order in the city. Goldberg suggests that the "staged and dramatic way" that the case is presented reflects its contrived nature and that the things that Rykener said were carefully chosen for transcription for the mayor's electoral purposes. The Rykener case would have bolstered mayor Fresshe's image at a time when it needed help. He had been accused—amongst other things—of imprisoning people who sued him for their rights.

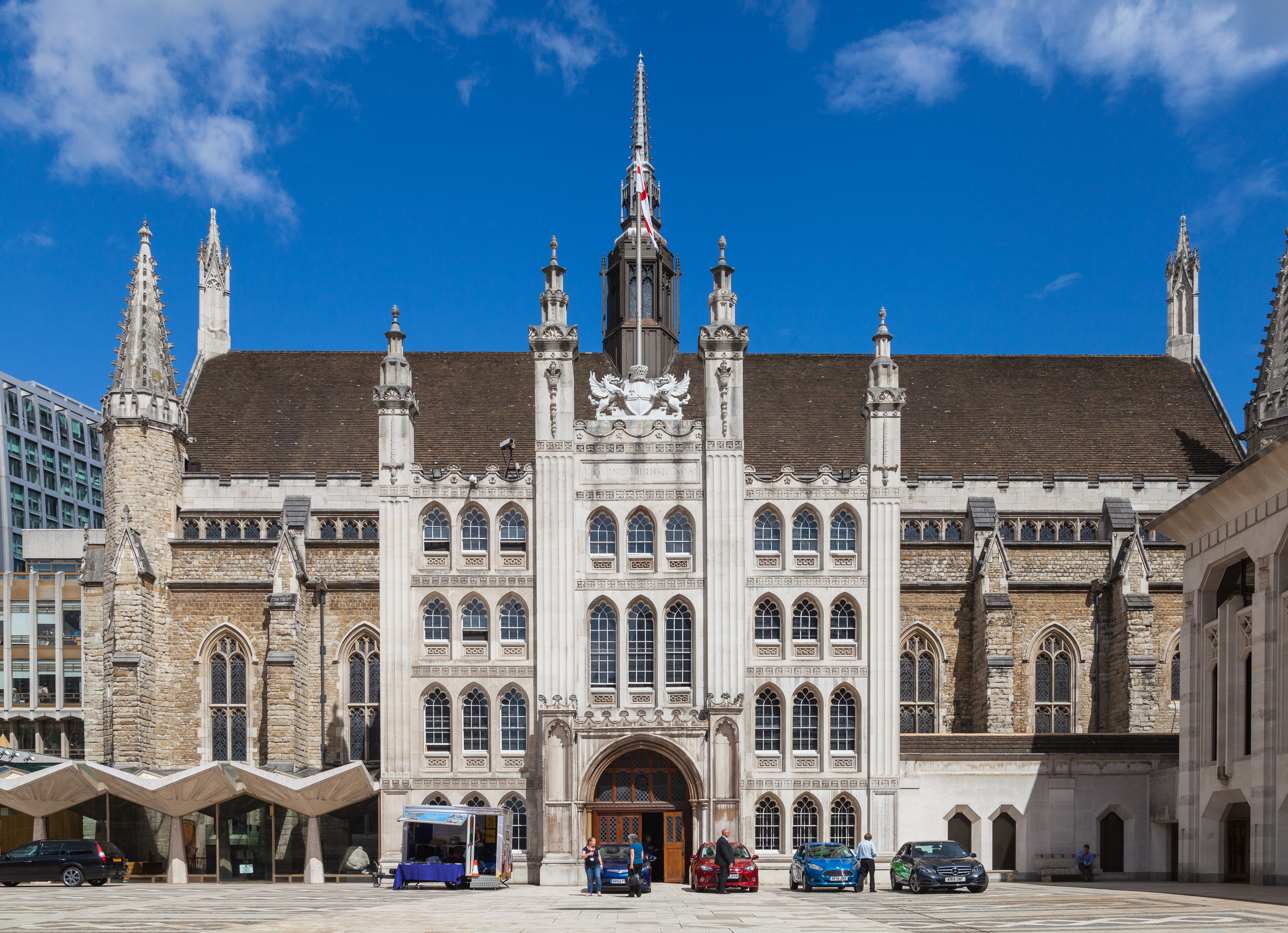
London's Guildhall in 2014. Construction of the current building began in the early fifteenth century. Parts, such as the crypts, date from Rykener's time.

The Rykener case took place in a turbulent period in the city's relations with the King. Two years earlier Richard II had stripped the city of its liberties and imprisoned mayor John Hende and his city sheriffs. (Note: This episode has been labelled "Richard II's quarrel with London" by modern historians. The actual cause of the King's displeasure remains unknown; in 1392, Richard announced that he had discovered "notable and evident defaults in the government and rule of the city". Caroline Barron has suggested that the cause was probably "the seemingly impregnable, and highly irritating, realm of city custom" along with general concerns over law and order. Regardless of Richard's precise motives, in May 1393 he removed the Court of Common Pleas to York, itself a highly detrimental act to the city, which would lose much business by its move. Further, the mayor and aldermen were summoned to appear before the King and council "under pain of forfeiture of life and limb", following which they were all stripped of their offices. Within the week the King had appointed his own officials to the city's administration and a royal commission investigated alleged breaches by the city of its own ordinances. The result was that the mayor and aldermen for that and the previous term were fined a total of 3000 marks, and the city's liberties were lost to the King. The city was further fined £100,000 and lost the right it had held from time immemorial to elect its own mayor. The city regained the King's trust over a period of time; the fines laid upon the city, mayor and aldermen had been remitted by late 1392, although it took another eighteen months for the King to confirm the return of the city's liberties at Cheapside. Even then, they were only held during the King' pleasure, and were not granted back permanently until 1397.) The city's privileges had only been restored in August 1394, following a loan of £10,000 from the city to the King. The ritual restoration of these liberties also took place on Cheapside. (Note: The city was not completely forgiven until 1397 when it received a royal charter confirming its liberties in perpetuity. The King himself became so hated by Londoners that, Froissart reported, they "could hardly mention his name without adding, "Damn and blast the dirty bugger".) Goldberg notes that the King repaid that loan only the day before Rykener and Britby had been arrested; this is not necessarily coincidental, Goldberg says.

Goldberg argues that the King's original quarrel with London had been over (perceived) misgovernance, which necessitated him governing the city instead. The Rykener case can thus be viewed as an object lesson in good self-governance: "malefactors are swiftly detected and promptly brought to answer for their misdeeds". The city demonstrated, through Rykener, its ability to address "the frequent resort of, and consorting with, common harlots", which led to "many and divers affrays, broils, and dissensions". The interrogators seem to have been particularly interested in Rykener's dealings with the clergy, which may account for their bringing the case before a mayoral court originally. Sodomy came under ecclesiastical jurisdiction, prostitution was a civic offence, and cases concerning priests were traditionally dealt with by church courts. Such was the unpopularity of the clergy, suggests Goldberg, that "courts would welcome the opportunity thus presented of showing up a man in holy orders", even if they were unable to prosecute him.

Judith Bennett considers that the frequency with which hermaphroditism is mentioned in contemporary texts indicates an incurious acceptance of the condition. If so, she suggests, "Rykener's repeated forays into the space between 'male' and 'female' might have been as unremarkable in the streets of fourteenth-century London as they would be in Soho today".

== Historical significance ==
Historians have been aware of Rykener's case since a calendared version of the legal record was published by Arthur Hermann Thomas in his 1932 Calendar of Select Plea and Memoranda Rolls, London, 1381–1412. Thomas's summary noted only that an examination had taken place "of two men charged with immorality, of whom one implicated several persons, male and female, in religious orders". The case remained in obscurity until the mid-1990s, when the original manuscript records were discovered by Ruth Mazo Karras and David Lorenzo Boyd in the London Metropolitan Archives. The Rykener documents were filed with the more usual, and more prosaic, fare of debt and property offences that the mayor's court traditionally dealt with. It has been suggested that of particular concern for the officials was not so much the act itself, but Rykener's switching of gender roles. This perceived importance may account for the survival of the record, as it may have been considered to have set a precedent.

While Rykener might have engaged in prostitution, he was not identified as a prostitute; while he might have practised sodomy, he was not clearly identified as a sodomite.

— Ruth Karras and David Boyd

The manuscript of Rykener's interrogation, according to one commentator, forms "apparently the only legal process document from late medieval England which deals with same-sex intercourse". The case has been described as offering a "microcosmic view of medieval English sexualities and the gulf that lies between the medieval and the modern"—the words used in both periods to describe sexuality mean different things to each. Rykener's case is also significant for its rarity. Surviving records from the fifteenth century provide only two examples of similar cases coming to court. (Note: One of which may not have been seen as sodomy at all; a man was accused of dressing as a woman and grabbing priests between their legs in public.)

It is not known what Rykener's encounters meant personally. As Ruth Karras has pointed out, scholarship on such affairs, "because it relies on court records, has focused much more on acts than on feelings", just as the records do. Thus it is not established whether Rykener's encounters were brief, or part of longer-term relationships. The majority, suggests Karras, were the former. Karras and Boyd point out the difficulties in viewing Rykener today as Rykener would have viewed themself. "In modern terms", they wrote in 1996, Rykener "would be described as a transvestite (because he cross-dressed) and a prostitute (because he took money for sex), and probably a bisexual" although this label is somewhat "problematic", they suggest, as scholars have no means of assessing what it would have meant to Rykener. In her 2016 essay, Karras used 'ze/hir' pronouns for Rykener as opposed to the male pronouns she and Boyd had used previously, and stated in 2013 that if she were to write the 1996 article again, "she would suggest that we might understand Rykener as a transgender person rather than as a 'transvestite', the term used in that article." (Note: Since "medieval people did not distinguish among sex, gender, and sexual orientation, or operate with the same concepts of identity as the contemporary West," some scholars analyse Rykener from a modern perspective to better understand medieval identity.)

== Scholarship and influence ==
The unusually full account contained in the London Plea and Memoranda Rolls of John Rykener's appearance before the mayor's court is both vivid and dramatic. Its narrative of cross-dressing, male prostitution, gay sex, clerical promiscuity and the like seems to offer a rare window onto medieval sexuality and sexual mores.

— Jeremy Goldberg

Historian James A. Schulz has suggested that Rykener's story is of more importance to historians than, for example, that of Tristan and Isolde. (Note: The courtly romance Tristan was originally told by Gottfried von Strassburg in the early thirteenth century. It is an adaptation of the 12th-century Tristan and Iseult legend. Gottfried's work is regarded, alongside Wolfram von Eschenbach's Parzival and the Nibelungenlied, as one of the great narrative masterpieces of the German Middle Ages. It is written, like all courtly romances, in rhyming couplets. Tristan is the "absolute courtly lover, who can only ever love one woman", and that with a "fatal passion". The love between Tristan and Isolde, Joan Tasker Grimbert has written, was "fated and reciprocal, dooming them to a premature death which they forestall as long as possible". Courtly love in Tristan was not just love, but "overwhelming obsession". There had been a resurgent interest in the Tristan legend in the late fourteenth century as new French translations were brought to England.) While their story illustrates little of the true nature of courtly love—being a paradigm and mythical rather than reality—Rykener's case tells much about the "marginal, transgressive" world of medieval sexuality. (Note: James Schultz puts this down to the fact that scholarship has begun to focus on what he terms "marginal figures like Eleanor and transgressive practices like cross-dressing". Schulz suggests that "we have learned a good deal about incest, sodomy, mystical ecstasies, prostitution, and various sorts of boundary crossing", while at the same time, conversely, "we still know very little ... about the "sexuality of courtly lovers like Tristan and Isold".) Rykener's responses to interrogation have been described as one of the very few glimpses the modern era has into medieval sexual identities. Another scholar has described the Rykener case as, with its "tangled language and arresting mix of frankness and ambiguity ... remain[ing] a mainstay of medieval, queer and gender studies ever since" Karras's discovery. Normington has described the case as an example of a medieval court "grappling with gender distinctions". Karras has argued that Rykener is a medieval example of a transgender person, rather than merely a transvestite or cross-dresser. Karras says that "even if we do not know anything about Rykener's self-identification, her life as a male-bodied woman was 'transgender-like'." (Note: Karras is careful not to apply historical anachronisms to the context. She has avoided "labels such as 'bisexual,' 'transvestite,' and 'prostitute' [which] cannot adequately convey the fourteenth-century London court's notion of Rykener's transgressions".) Karras notes that nothing is known of Rykener's (or anybody else's) feelings in this case, and since the interrogation was recorded in Latin (Note: The court proceedings themselves would have been conducted in English but then recorded in Latin. What remains today is the scribal clerk's précised interpretation of Rykener's and Britby's answers, rather than the verbatim replies themselves.) (which Rykener may not have known), historians may not have an accurate record of what was really said. The only time Rykener ever seems to have offered a personal opinion on these events was when Rykener opined to preferring priests: but this was "only because they paid more". Carolyn Dinshaw suggests that Rykener's living and working in Oxford as a woman for a time indicates that Rykener enjoyed doing so. Likewise, Cordelia Beattie considers that Rykener's ability to pass as a woman "in everyday life would have involved other gendered behaviour". She considers that to modern historians and sociologists, the Rykener case is part of a "long-standing tradition" within the study of gender. In her view, the case reveals the social presumptions held by the mayor and common council through their treatment of Rykener. For example, says Beattie, "it is noticeable that, according to the record, the men had sex with him, whereas he had sex with the women".

The case of 'Johannes Rykener, se Elianoram nominans' was tried in 1395. The verdicts are still being written. It was an unusual case with all the right (or wrong) ingredients for a ripping yarn—sex, money, cross-dressing, nuns—but even for all that, those involved might scarcely have believed the celebrity it would achieve six centuries later.

— Victoria Blud

Jeremy Goldberg has looked at the case in the context of where Rykener operated, as Cheapside was a major mercantile centre. Goldberg considers that the mayor and aldermen were most concerned with Rykener as a trader, and as a false one at that: "a tradesperson who purports to be an embroideress and a barmaid, but actually sells sex. ... Even as a prostitute he is a dishonest trader: he poses as a woman selling straight sex to male clients, whereas he is, in fact, a man masquerading as a woman." Goldberg suggests that historians may have misread the true significance of the original document. It is possible, he says, that the whole case was a fabrication by the scribes, who wanted to officially lodge an unofficial allegory against the King. Hence Rykener becomes a metaphor for Richard II following the dispute over the city's liberties and, much like Rykener was described in the accusation, Richard is "symbolically buggered" in Cheapside.

Ruth Evans, continuing the mercantile theme, has said Rykener "...makes of his own body an imitation. He counterfeits the work of God." During the interrogation, Rykener's sexual act with Britby was referred to on at least one occasion as "labour". If the mayor and aldermen are concerned with Rykener's honesty (or not), says Goldberg, then it is "here a specifically bourgeois concern that grows out of the needs of trade". Judith Bennett has suggested that Rykener, through choice of work, had "taken a women's passive position in society", and that it was this—rather than the actual offences of prostitution and sodomy—that "most transfixed" Rykener's interrogators. From this, and in comparison to her own period, she concludes that "gender was no more ordered in the middle ages than it is in the twenty-first century".

=== In popular culture ===
A fictionalised version of Rykener appears as a prominent character in Bruce Holsinger's 2014 historical novel, A Burnable Book, set in London in 1385. Rykener (whom Holsinger renames Edgar/Eleanor) acts as the reader's guide to the "juicy places" of fourteenth-century London's underworld.

A puppet show intended to explore Rykener as transgender—"combining medieval studies, drama, and puppetry"—called John–Eleanor debuted in 2011 and was performed at the Turku music festival in Finland the following year. It was later performed at the World Puppetry Festival in Charleville-Mézières, France, in 2017, with Timo Vantsi playing the title role. It was also performed in Italy, the United Kingdom and the United States.

== See also ==
- Amelio Robles Ávila
- Albert Cashier
- Chevalier d'Eon
- Christian Davies
- Elagabalus
- Hannah Snell
- James Barry
