= Kim Phillips =

Kim Phillips may refer to:

- Kim Phillips (American football) (born 1966)
- Kim Phillips (historian) (born 1950), Australian–New Zealand historian

== See also ==
- Kim Phillips-Fein (born 1975), American historian
