= John Fressh =

London merchant, and Mayor 1394–95

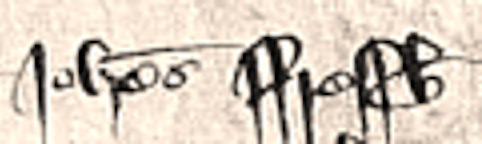
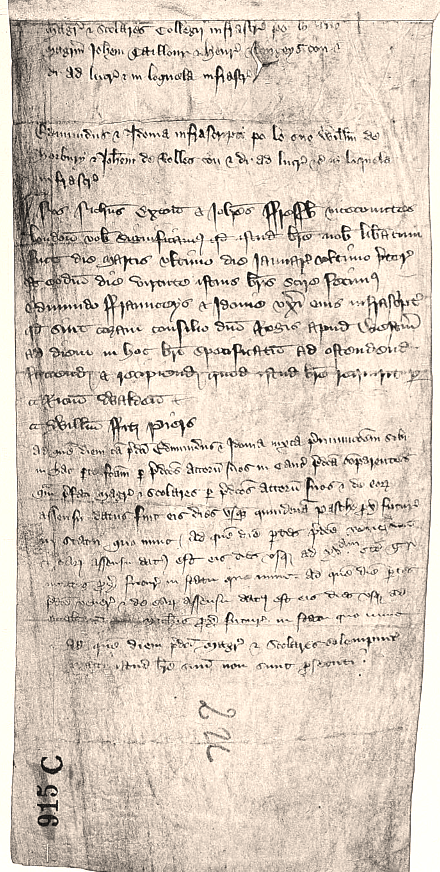

John Fressh (sometimes Frossh, Frosh, Frosshe, Fresshe, Fresche or Froysh) (died 6 September 1397) was a citizen, alderman, and Mayor of London in the latter years of the fourteenth century. A merchant by trade, he was a member of the Mercers' Company, a medieval London trade guild, and has been described as one of London's leading citizens of his time.

Fressh's early life is unknown to historians, and he only appears in the records with his marriage to Juliana, the daughter of an influential merchant, in 1373. From then on, promotion within the city's political machinery was swift. He soon became an alderman, or councillor, and undertook service to both the city and the King, Richard II. He encountered personal and political difficulties in 1381 after the Peasants' Revolt. In the early 1380s, he and colleagues in other victualling trade guilds clashed with a reformist tendency within the Common Council led by John Northampton. In revenge, Northampton accused Fressh of treasonously assisting the rebels, and he was imprisoned for a short time. Fressh's party was soon able to take power on the council, however, which saw him restored to favour.

With this exception, Fressh appears to have avoided too many political pitfalls. He concentrated on his mercantile interests, in the process making a lot of money for himself and for colleagues for whom he acted as a broker. However, this was interrupted in 1392, when the King, dissatisfied with the Common Council's running of London affairs, had all the city's officials arrested for a short period and suspended the city's rights to appoint its Mayor and council. This crisis does not seem to have interrupted Fressh for long; he and his colleagues were soon released, and, indeed, in 1394 Fressh was elected Mayor. During his mayoralty, he was accused of imprisoning citizens who criticised him and also oversaw the unusual Rykener case in the mayoral court.

Fressh died a wealthy man in 1397 and was buried in the Church of St Benet Sherehog, which had been receiving his patronage for some years. His wife survived him, and their three daughters made good marriages into the families of Fressh's fellow merchants.

== Political background ==
=== London ===
The historian Michael Hicks has described late-medieval London as "the largest port, the largest market and retail outlet for luxuries and manufacture, and the largest employer" in Late Medieval England. Nationally and financially, it was the most important trading post in the country, handling over 60 per cent of English trade abroad. Throughout the period, maintaining control of—and influence in―the city was of fundamental importance for every monarch. (Note: "London was, moreover, the capital of England in part because of its proximity to Westminster. So kings processed through the city before their coronations and ... London crowds provided the required collaudatio for usurpers such as Henry IV in 1399 and Edward IV in 1461".) For their part, London's citizens benefited from proximity to royal administration, justice, and patronage, with Parliament and the King's Council at Westminster. The city, though, was also hit heaviest by the King's poll taxes of 1376–1381, damaging the King's relations with the city.

=== Relations with the crown ===
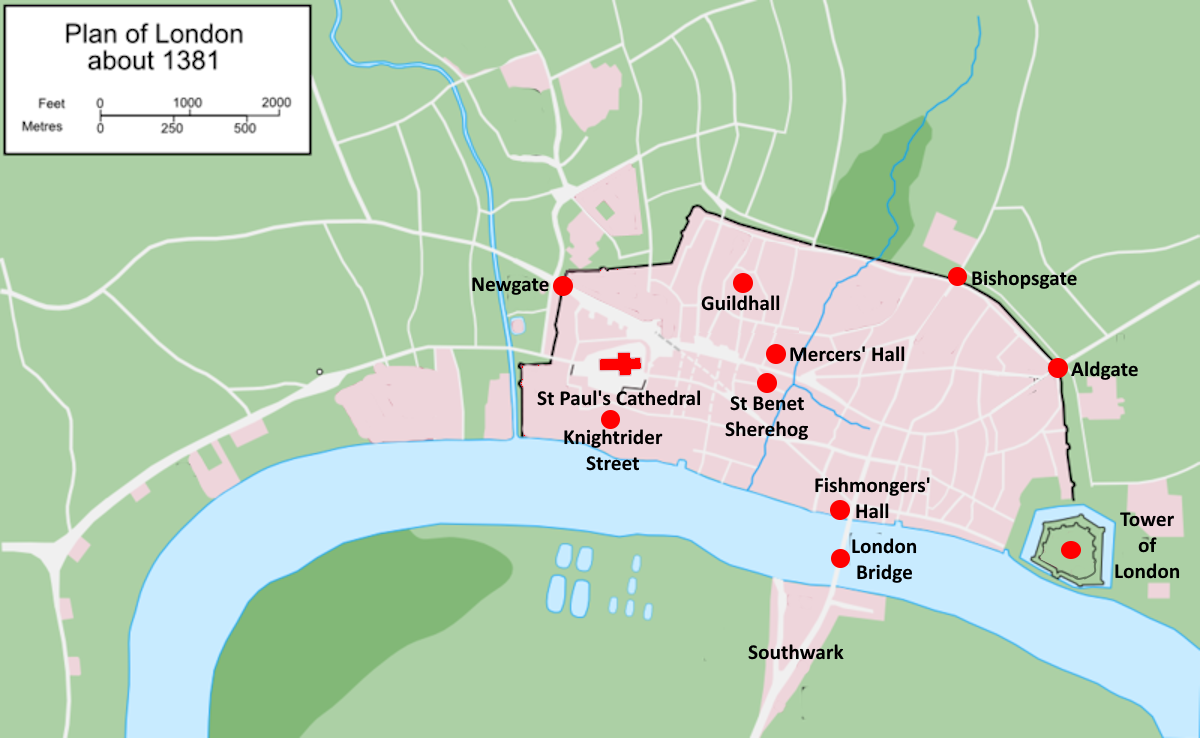

Clickable map of John Fresshe's London, c. 1381

London was governed and administered by men from its merchant class, who were organised by their trades into different guilds (or misteries). These men, among whom Fressh was numbered, formed London's political upper class. They filled the offices of alderman, sheriff, and Mayor, and governed through the Common Council. The common council members were omnicompetent on financial matters, and more delicate city negotiations with the King or his council would be referred to the Common Council. The city was politically turbulent at this time. (Note: Particularly following the Good Parliament of 1376. Barron points out that actually, "for most of its history, London had been turbulent".) Although a contemporary chronicler, Jean Froissart, believed Richard II favoured London at the expense of the rest of the kingdom, it is probable that King and city had poor opinions of the other. But, they had to live with each other: the Crown depended on the wealth of London's merchants for the subsidies and loans they provided, and the city relied on the King to protect its trade abroad and its liberties at home. (Note: A liberty was a geographic unit in Medieval England, traditionally defined as an area in which the regalian right was revoked and where the land was held by a mesne lord, with rights previously reserved to the king having devolved into private, usually corporate, ownership. Medievalist Shannon McSheffrey has described the urban administration of London at this time as "a bricolage of separate jurisdictions: both within the walls of the City itself and in its suburbs were numerous liberties, territorial zones that by royal grant exercised varying levels of independence".)

Relations were not only strained between city and Crown, but also suffered internecine tension, having been riven with factional strife since the late 1370s. This had several causes, including the aftermath of plague outbreaks with concomitant depopulation, followed by different guilds vying for power, combined with a high level of immigration and an as-yet undeveloped sense of community solidarity. It was also rumoured that the King's uncle, John of Gaunt, was planning to replace the elected Mayor with a captain appointed by the Crown. By 1381, London's ruling class was itself engaged in a bitter internal feud for political dominance on the council and was thus unstable and divided. These issues were to influence city politics throughout Fressh's lifetime, until Richard lost his throne in 1399.

== Early life and marriage ==
Nothing is known of Fressh's early life. (Note: This John Fressh is not to be confused with an earlier London citizen of that name, also a fishmonger, who was temporarily exiled from the city in 1339 following several instances of rioting between the Fishmongers' Company and other guilds, notably the Skinners' Company.) The medievalist Carol Rawcliffe has suggested that since he later married the widow of a leading mercer, Nicholas Ploket, (Note: Even less is known of Ploket. Originally from Brabant, at some point he became a naturalised English subject. He was a legal adult by 1355 when he is recorded as exporting worsted from London, and he became a wealthy landholder in Essex.) Fressh could have been apprenticed to him as a young man. At some point, he became a merchant and joined the Mercers' Guild, one of the more important of medieval London's livery companies. It is only with his marriage, which had occurred by March 1376, that Fressh starts appearing on city records. His wife, Juliana, (Note: According to some sources, Gillian.) was the daughter of an influential Essex landholder, William Langrich, and brought him not only a respectable dowry but a substantial portfolio of estates in that county. This included two messuages (Note: Messuage was a medieval English legal term denoting the principal dwelling place in a larger property; the word stems from the mansa. It applied almost exclusively to the real estate of the landed classes and aristocracy particularly notes the medieval archaeologist N. J. Higham, "manorial complexes and moated sites". The lower class equivalent was the toft.) and 250 acres (100 ha) in Barking, while to the north of the county, she inherited a small estate in Nazeing, and in the south, the manor of North Ockendon and lands in Cranham. This estate was probably worth much more than the stated amount of £6 (equivalent to £5,665 in 2025). In London, she brought him a house in Cordwainer Street and other properties in Havering and Cheapside.

Fressh also augmented his Essex portfolio in his own right, purchasing a watermill and land in Havering-atte-Bower, and becoming lord of the manor of Dovores, an area which stretched from Havering to Bowers Gifford. He also successfully pursued unpaid debts to his father-in-law from the time of Edward III. Fressh must have been a relatively wealthy man even in the early days of his career, as in 1379 he was one of 200 citizens who donated—in his case the substantial sum of five marks (Note: A medieval English mark was a unit of currency equivalent to two-thirds of a pound.)—to the city's subscription fund established to encourage the "great lords of the realm" to return to Westminster for an approaching royal council. (Note: The fund came about from the city's need to pay for urgent civil works. However, by 1378 the lords had almost to a man withdrawn from London, following an attack on the Earl of Buckingham's servants. This deprived several of the city's important economic sectors—such as hostellers, vintners and purveyors of luxury goods—of valuable trade. In an attempt to gain the goodwill—and hence patronage—of the nobility, the city raised £600 (equivalent to £600,000 in 2025) in what the historian Michael McCarthy has called "a somewhat pandering solution"—to incentivize their return.)

== Career ==
"...Divisions within the city itself, between citizens and the unenfranchised, the merchants and artisans, and the bitter economic rivalry between the different guilds, all destroyed the possibility of a united front" against the 1381 rebels.

— Caroline Barron

Fressh was appointed a collector of King Richard II's ill-fated poll tax in December 1380, and elected alderman of the city of London's Bassishaw Ward on 12 March 1381. The poll tax was to provoke the Peasants' Revolt in May that year, which saw a rebel army from Essex march on London the following month. Fressh was one of three leading citizens—along with fellow mercers John Horn and Adam Karlille—sent by the then-Mayor, William Walworth, to parley with the rebels' leader Wat Tyler, whose army was assembled at Blackheath. Fressh and his colleagues were to negotiate with the rebels, and, if possible, persuade them to withdraw. However, says the historian Juliet Barker, even though the rebels "had been on the point of returning to their homes [Horn]... exceeded his authority". (Note: It is almost certain that he did indeed do so. Ruth Bird comments that, following the meeting on Blackheath, Horn brought several rebel leaders to his own home in the city and lodged them there, and even found them a royal banner to march under. He then took advantage of the subsequent turmoil to reclaim debts owed him by force and to evict people from their homes.) He supposedly told the rebels that "the whole city of London felt as they did", which encouraged the rebels to move against the capital. What is certain is that on the afternoon of 13 June 1381, the rebels assembled in Southwark before attacking London Bridge, which opened its gates without resistance. This army, in turn, allowed another rebel force entry through Aldgate. Many rebellious Londoners joined them, and what a later commission recorded as "treasons, murders, killings, executions, the burning and destruction of houses as well as other intolerable and hitherto unheard-of evils" began.

To what extent Fressh supported Horn's actions is unclear. In an inquisition held at Easter 1383 it was alleged that both the other aldermen indeed supported Horn. However, since these hearings were held during Northampton's mayoralty, it is likely that Fressh was the victim of a conspiracy. He was found guilty of treasonably assisting the rebels and imprisoned in the Tower of London. However, a later inquisition in November found otherwise, and Fressh was bailed, by which time his fellow mercer and friend, Nicholas Brembre, was Mayor. All three envoys do, however, appear to have at least encouraged the mob to set the Marshalsea Prison on fire and in the words of the medievalist Ruth Bird, "it is doubtful there was even much disapproval when the marshal, Richard Imworth, was dragged from sanctuary at Westminster and murdered".

=== Mercantile career ===
Successful trading made Fressh an extremely wealthy man. He did not confine himself to mercery but also involved himself in the lucrative wool trade to the continent. The quantities involved could be substantial: on one occasion in 1385, he was licensed to send 13 sarples of wool to Calais. (Note: A sarple, or sarplier, is an archaic term for a bale, or a wrapper, probably of sacking, of wool. It seems never to have become a standard weight in the Middle Ages, and the evidence suggests considerable variety in sizes. The Oxford English Dictionary defines a single unit as 80 tods, where a tod is usually 28 pounds (13 kg); therefore Fressh's export may have been in the region of 13,500 kilograms (29,800 lb).) As a mercer, he trained many apprentices. In 1392, for example, these were William Walderne, Walter Cotton, Thomas Grene and Thomas Welle. They did not solely learn the mercer's trade from Fressh; he also used them as his agents abroad to further his wool trading, as Walderne, for example, did in Calais in 1388. Fressh also traded on behalf of his colleagues, and Walderne brokered Brembre's wool abroad. (Note: Brembre's political downfall and execution in 1388 caused Fressh a substantial financial loss. At the time of his death, Fressh had not yet been paid by Brembre for his brokering of the latter's wool abroad, and this amounted to £400 (equivalent to £400,000 in 2025). Fressh did not recover payment until 1393.) Fressh also traded luxury cloth worth hundreds of pounds to Calais and Portugal.

Fressh not only made money but also lent it; he was a ready litigant when it was necessary to recover a debt. Between 1381 and 1383, he launched nine recovery lawsuits, recovering over £90 (equivalent to £100,000 in 2025). One such suit was against his wife's cousin, John Langrich.

=== Feud with John of Northampton ===
Following the Peasants' Revolt, the reputations of Walworth and the incumbent Common Council had been tarnished, allowing the election of a member of the Grocers, John Northampton. Northampton was elected Mayor in 1381 on a highly populist, radical agenda which included one-year terms for aldermen and proposals for new election machinery. These set him on a collision course with the powerful Fishmongers' Company who had a monopoly on the supply of fish to London. This was because, for religious reasons, people fasted for a quarter of the days each year, and accordingly, London required a plentiful supply of cheap, fresh fish. The fishmongers, however, were aggressive in the first instance and lax in the latter: the city records condemn their high prices for produce described as "putrid and corrupt, unwholesome as food for man, and an abomination". As a leading mercer, Fressh was caught up in the resultant political confrontation between Northampton and the victualling companies, who were led by traditionalists such as Bembre and the fishmonger, Nicholas Exton. Northampton's election posed a serious challenge to Fressh, and, says Rawcliffe, even "threatened to terminate [his] promising career".

Northampton was temporarily successful in his campaign against the victuallers. He reignited the accusation that some aldermen—including personal political enemies such as Horne and Karlille—assisted the 1381 rebels. Northampton petitioned to have them brought to trial on treason charges, although nothing was done until October 1382, by which time Northampton's term of office had ended. (Note: The reason for this delay, suggests Carol Rawcliffe, was that it was "only then that [John More, Northampton's deputy and] Northampton finalized their plans for discrediting (and thus effectively removing) those who opposed their radical plans for reform".) At that hearing, Fressh and four others—Horn, Karlille and Walter Sibil, fishmongers with Exton, and William Tonge, a vintner, were accused of helping the rebels to enter London. They were also accused of attacking the Guildhall in an attempt to seek out and burn the Jubilee Book on 14 June. (Note: This was the Common Council's book of ordinances, called le Jubyle, or Jubilee Book, so-named because of its compilation during Edward III's jubilee year, 1376–1377. It substantially and radically revised the city's ordinances: depending on the political hue of the administration of the day, it either "comprised all the good articles appertaining to the good government of the City" or "ordinances repugnant to the ancient customs of the City".) Northampton and his supporters had "engineered these proceedings as a means of undermining the party of the merchant capitalists", as historian Anthony Steel has described the politically traditional victualling guilds. Fressh faced lesser charges than his colleagues, but his situation was dangerous enough to result in his imprisonment alongside them in the Tower of London. Despite the less severe charges, he was the last to be released. His incarceration excluded him and the others from civic office for the next year. In the event Northampton only served a single term of office, and Fressh and his colleagues were pardoned within a few months when Brembre—Fressh's fellow mercer and business partner—became Mayor. After a third and final inquisition, all four men were found to be innocent of all charges.

== Later career ==
If, as was alleged, Fressh had failed in his duty as a messenger to the rebels in 1381, and had allowed them to enter the City unopposed, his conduct was almost certainly dictated by prudence rather than sympathy for the mob. The consequences of resistance might well have been serious, and it is evident that no one at the time considered him guilty of treason. His re-election as an alderman in March 1385 shows how quickly he recovered from this short period of disgrace.

— Carol Rawcliffe, History of Parliament Trust

Fressh's ally Brembre served three terms of office. During his second, from 1384–85, Fressh served as sheriff for the city and Middlesex, and the same year he was also elected to the Common Council and appointed gaol deliverer. In 1385 he petitioned the King, unsuccessfully, for Northampton's execution. This year also saw his election as alderman to Cordwainer Ward, which he held until 1394. Apart from an otherwise unknown dispute with one Philip Derneforde, in which the latter was bound over £100 (equivalent to £100,000 in 2025) to do Fressh no harm, these years appear to have been generally uneventful, mostly involving trading and the accumulation of offices. At Easter 1386, he received the Forestership of Waltham Hundred, Essex. This office was a hereditary position he inherited by right of his wife, although they seem to have soon after conveyed it to the Abbey of Waltham. In 1392 he was appointed to a commission to confiscate the goods and property of the Count of Vertus, while on 12 December the following year he became a Constable of the Westminster Staple, which furthered his business interests and allowed him to make new commercial contacts, albeit with largely routine duties. He held this post until 7 July 1393.

Relations between the King and the city, often fragile, were about to collapse during a period known as Richard II's "quarrel with London". On 22 June 1392 Fressh, and his colleagues in the Common Council, received a royal summons to attend upon the King in Northampton. There Richard denounced London's civic leadership, telling them that he had found unspecified "notable and evident defaults" with their governance of the city, inducing his grave displeasure. London's liberties and right to self-government were immediately suspended; the King sent in his own men as wardens in place of the Common Council, and Fressh and his erstwhile colleagues and their predecessors were summoned before a comprehensive tribunal in Eton. In May 1392, the King removed the Court of Common Pleas to York; this was a highly detrimental act to the city, which would lose much business by its removal. Furthermore, the Mayor and aldermen were summoned to appear before the King and council under pain of death, and there they were stripped of their offices. Within the week, the King had appointed his own officials to the city's administration, and a royal commission investigated alleged breaches by the city of its own ordinances. The result was that the Mayor and aldermen from that and the previous two terms (i.e. since October 1389) (Note: Mayoral terms ran for 365 days from 28/29 October.) were fined a total of 3,000 marks, and the city's liberties were forfeited to the King. The city was further fined £100,000 (equivalent to £94,400,000 in 2025) and, for the next few months, lost the right it had held from time immemorial to elect its own Mayor. (Note: This episode has been labelled "Richard II's quarrel with London" by modern historians. The actual cause of the King's displeasure remains unknown. Caroline Barron has suggested that the cause was probably "the seemingly impregnable, and highly irritating, realm of city custom" along with general concerns over law and order. Ruth Bird suggests that the King was attempting to gain the money through fines that he had requested several times in loans, yet had been refused. The city regained the King's trust over a period of time; the fines laid upon the city, mayor and aldermen had been remitted by late 1392, although it took another eighteen months for the King to confirm the return of the city's liberties at Cheapside. Even then, they were only held during the King' pleasure and were not granted back permanently until 1397.)

In January 1394, Fressh attended parliament at Westminster for the City of London constituency, the only occasion on which he did so. (Note: It was at this parliament that Farringdon Ward was split in two because of excessive overcrowding, both within and outside the city walls. The city had lodged a petition to the King, and, as part of the reconciliation process between the King and London (following a bitter dispute between them that took up much of 1392–1394), (Note: Richard II had stripped the city of its liberties and imprisoned Mayor John Hende and his sheriffs in 1392.) the King granted the city the right to create two new wards, that of Farringdon Within and Farringdon Without.)

=== Mayorality ===
Intense negotiations between Crown and city—pro concordia facienda versus Regem pro civibus London—led to the restoration of the latter's mayoral rights by October 1392, the traditional date of the city's annual elections. Fressh himself was elected Mayor in 1394; his mayoralty was generally uneventful, (Note: Compared, for example, to Fressh's ally Brembre, who, caught up in the bitter feud between the King and the Lords Appellant, had ended up getting hanged at Tyburn for his pains in February 1388.) although he appears to have made some enemies. A member of the Taylors Guild, John Wapole, held a deep-seated grievance against Fressh over his earlier treatment while incarcerated in Ludgate Prison. In early 1395, he and Fressh encountered each other near St Paul's Cathedral in which Walpole threatened "mayor, do me justice, or I will bring such a mob about you that you will be glad to do justice". Fressh had him immediately condemned to Newgate Prison, which Walpole claimed was false imprisonment and retaliation for his suing for justice. At an inquisition in Newgate, the jurors decided that, in fact, "a great part of the uproar and rancour in the city from the time of Nicholas Twyford [1388] to the present day was made and spread by the ill-will of John Walpole, who was a great disseminator of discord".

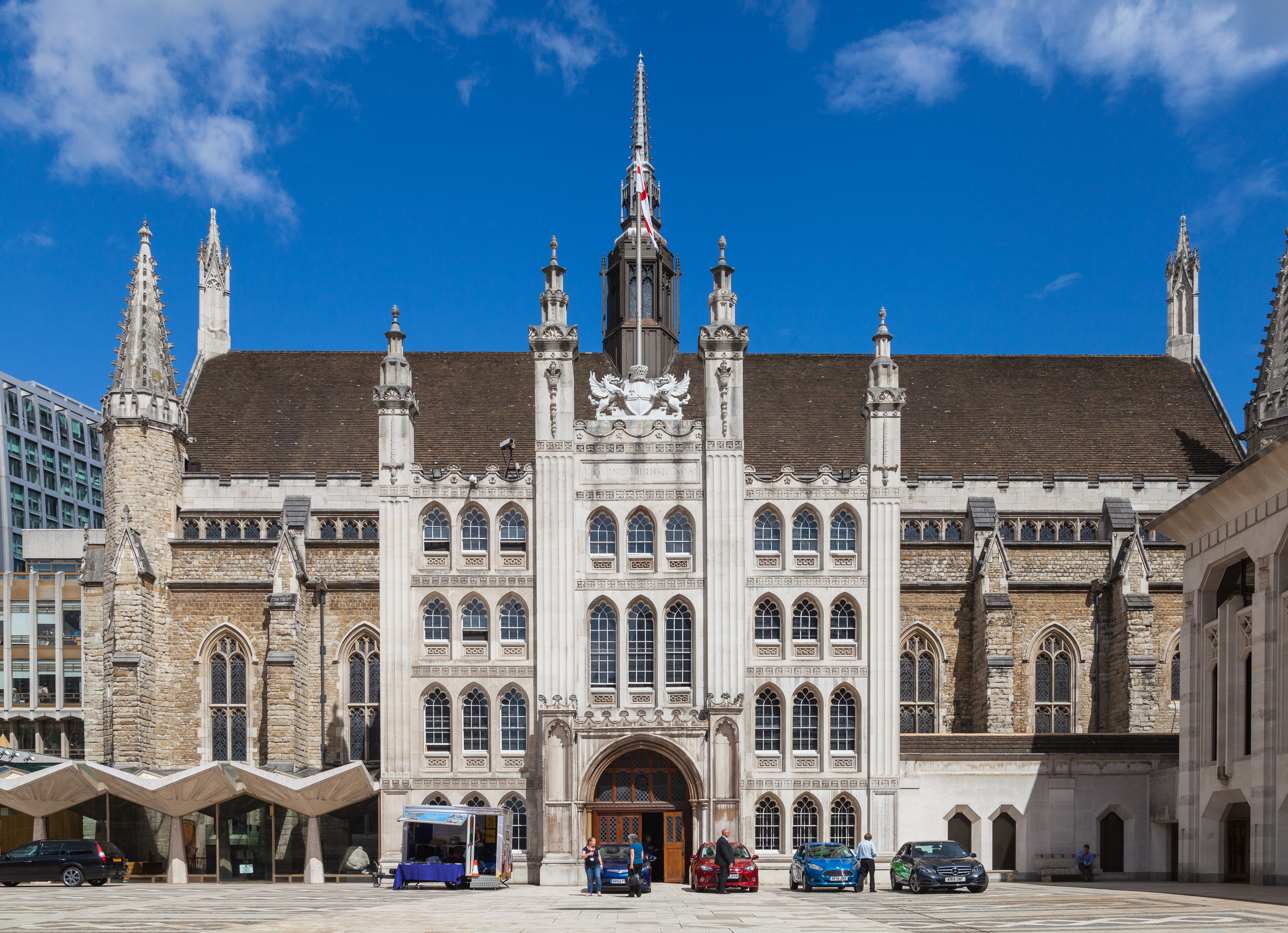
London's Guildhall in 2014. Construction of the current building began in the early fifteenth century. Fressh would, however, have known other parts of it which are still extant, for example, the medieval crypts below the current structure.

One particularly notable case that came before him at the mayoral court was that of Johannes Rykener, se Elianorum nominans veste muliebri detectus ("John Rykener, calling [himself] Eleanor, having been detected in woman's clothing"), as the record of Rykener's interrogation begins. Rykener had been discovered in flagrante delicto by the night watch, dressed in female attire, with a northern merchant called John Britby in Cheapside. They were accused of "lying by a certain stall in Soper's Lane, committing that detestable unmentionable and ignominious vice". (Note: This "suggestively reticent turn of phrase" is the writing of the recording clerk. Such florid language was common in the description of people and acts deemed illegal or immoral by the courts. Prostitution, for example, was regularly referred to as "'the stinking and horrible sin of lechery', practised by strumpets", even in the official city ordinances.) Rykener and Britby were interrogated separately by Fressh and the collected aldermen of the Common Council. These events cannot be precisely dated, as the records are only in a very loose order, but the relevant documents come just before a plaint regarding a property dispute on 26 January 1395. The medievalist Jeremy Goldberg, examining Fressh's role in these proceedings, questions whether the case was actually part of a propaganda stunt. He argues that Fressh had political reasons for bringing someone like Rykener before the Bench; doing so allowed him to demonstrate his commitment to strong law and order in the city. Goldberg suggests that the "staged and dramatic way" that the case is presented in the record reflects its contrived nature and that the things that Rykener said were carefully chosen for transcription for the Mayor's own purposes. The Rykener case would have bolstered Fressh's image at a time when he was unpopular, having been criticised, for example, of imprisoning people who sued him for their rights, such as by the supporters of Walpole. Goldberg argues that Fressh's treatment of Rykener was intended to demonstrate his swift and firm application of justice and good governance: "malefactors are swiftly detected and promptly brought to answer for their misdeeds". However, if Rykener was ever charged with an offence, the outcome of the case is unknown; there are no explicit charges, verdict or sentence and no further court action is documented. Rykener subsequently disappears from the historical record.

Fressh appears to have emerged relatively unscathed from these events. Despite his earlier often sour relations with the King, Fressh had no objection to lending Richard £200 (equivalent to £200,000 in 2025) in October 1396. This may be, says Rawcliffe, because "given that Richard's indignation against the Londoners was initially aroused because of their refusal to advance £5,000 (equivalent to £4,700,000 in 2025) in credit, Fressh, as one of the richest citizens of the day, may well have been singled out for a particular display of royal displeasure".

== Personal life ==
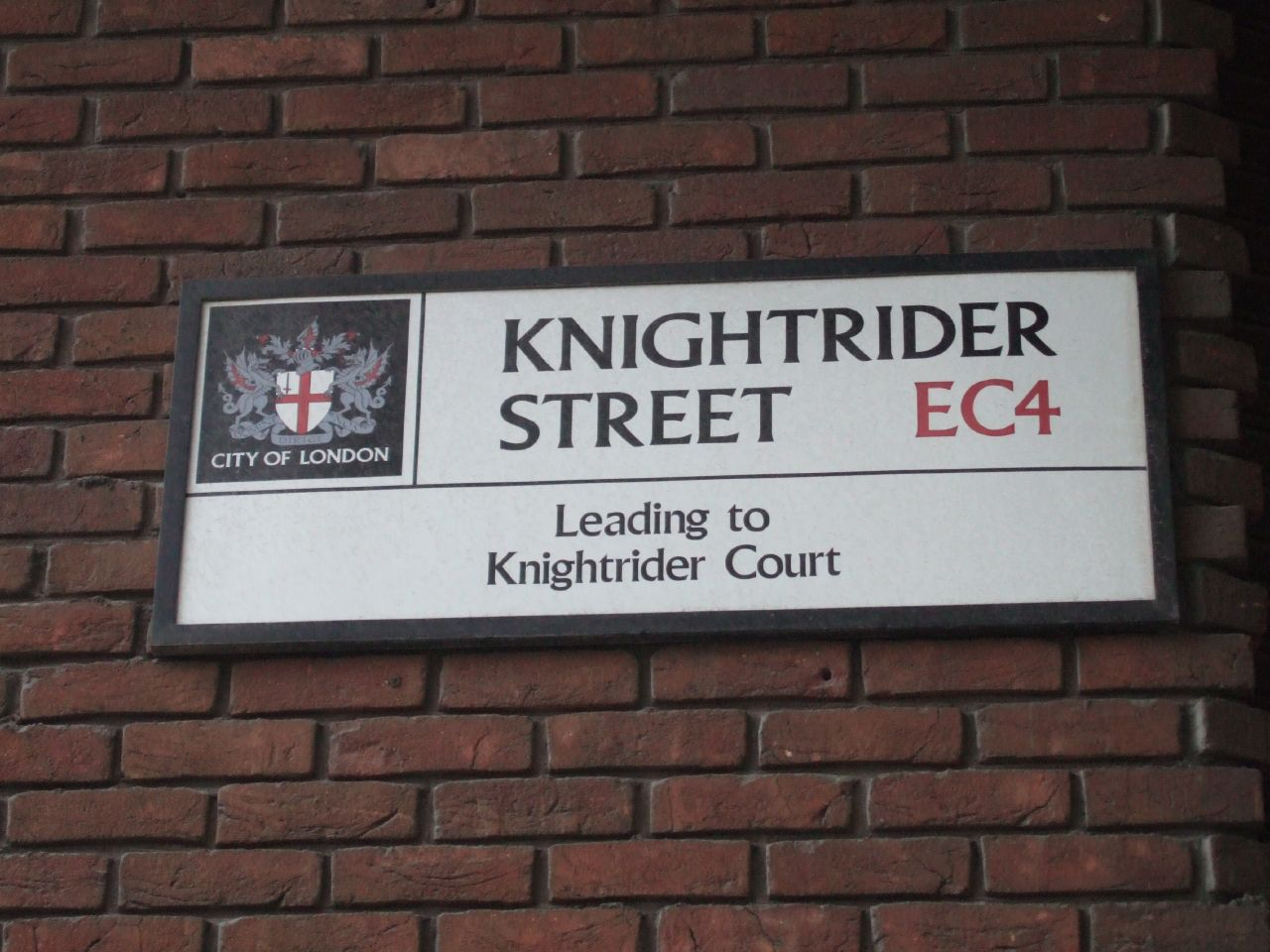
Knightrider Street sign, London, in 2006. In John Fressh's day, the street had various spellings, including Knyghtridestrete; Knyghtriderestrete, Knyghtryderestrete, Knyghtrederistret and Knightriders streete.

Fressh and Juliana had three daughters, all of whom made good marriages. The eldest, Christine, married a royal official, one John Squiry, escheator of Essex. Another married a grocer and alderman Walter Newenton, who would be sheriff of London from 1411 to 1412. Margaret married Walter Cotton, one of Fressh's old apprentices, and who, says Rawcliffe, prospered, "becoming an alderman and sheriff, like his master before him". Newenton and Cotton were also Fressh's feoffees and executors; the latter and Margaret received the rent and reversion of Fressh's tenements in Cheapside in his will.

Fressh was active in the mercers until his death on 6 September 1397. Rawcliffe has described him as, on his death, "among the wealthiest merchants in London", a judgment illustrated by his will. This was proven on 1 September that year, and enrolled 10 March following, listing his bequests. Fressh left over £600 (equivalent to £600,000 in 2025) to be distributed among his relatives, friends and colleagues. His wife received his plate, and his eldest daughter an annuity of 50 marks. He left a quit-rent from a tenement in Knightrider Street to John Newton, rector of St Benet Sherehog Church in Poultry. This was to provide for a chantry, and was only one of two that the church received, designated specifically to the maintenance and upkeep of the physical fabric of the building. Fressh directed that he should also be buried in the church's St. Sith's chapel; for this, he left an additional bequest of nine marks. This paid for a chaplain to celebrate mass for four years, "for his soul, the souls of his wife and children and all Christian souls". The Elizabethan chronicler John Stow recorded that, after death, Fressh had a monument to him within the Church. Fressh had supported St Benet Sherehog since at least 1395, when he and grocer William Chichele—brother of Henry, later Archbishop of Canterbury—had made it a joint-grant. (Note: King Henry VIII dissolved the English monasteries in the late 1530s, and this included chantries such as St Benet's Sherhog. In 1548, the King's commissioners, who were auditing the closed houses and assessing their value to the crown, noted that the church (in the form of one chaplain) was still being supported by Fressh's bequest of 1397.) Fressh's Inquisition post mortem was held in 1398.
