= Mark Ormrod (historian) =

Welsh historian (1957–2020)

William Mark Ormrod FRHistS FSA
- Born: 1 November 1957; Neath, Wales
- Died: 2 August 2020 (aged 62); York, England

Academic background
- Education: University of Oxford
- Thesis: Edward III's government of England, c.1346–1356 (1984)

Academic work
- Discipline: History
- Sub-discipline: Medieval England; legal history; political history
- Institutions: University of York; St Catharine's College, Cambridge; Queen's University Belfast; University of Sheffield
- Doctoral students: J. L. Laynesmith

William Mark Ormrod, FRHistS, FSA (1 November 1957–2 August 2020) was a Welsh historian who specialised in the Later Middle Ages of England. Born in South Wales, he studied at King's College, London, and then earned his Doctor of Philosophy at Worcester College, Oxford. He was employed at a number of institutions, eventually settling at the University of York where he became Dean of the History Faculty and director of the Centre for Medieval Studies. He researched and published widely, including nine books and over 80 book chapters. Ormrod retired in 2017 and died of cancer in 2020.

== Early life ==
Ormrod was born in Neath, South Wales, on 1 November 1957 to David and Margaret Ormrod, and had two younger brothers. He attended the local boys' grammar school, where he was head boy; he played and sang music. He took a first-class undergraduate degree at King's College, London in 1979, and undertook postgraduate study at Worcester College, Oxford. He researched his D.Phil. on the administration of Edward III's government between the years 1346 and 1356. This was awarded in 1984.

== Career ==
After completing his doctorate, Ormrod held positions at the University of Sheffield, Queen's University Belfast, and St Catharine's College, Cambridge, obtaining a lectureship at the University of York in 1990. Here, he was appointed professor of History in 1995. He subsequently became Director of York’s Centre for Medieval Studies (1998–2001 and 2002–2003), Head of the Department of History (2001, 2003–2007), and Dean of the Faculty of Arts and Humanities from 2009 until taking early retirement in 2017. Following the 2013 discovery of the remains of King Richard III — who died at the Battle of Bosworth in 1485 — beneath a car park in Leicester, Ormrod supported the campaign to have the dead monarch reinterred in Yorkshire, saying the King had

Regarded Yorkshire as his political and family home. The available evidence suggests that he wanted to be buried not in the Midlands or the South, but at York Minster. In Richard’s own time, royal remains were often exhumed and moved significant distances for more dignified reburial. Richard’s own preferences, and good historical precedent, therefore dictate that England’s last Yorkist king should be interred in the fittingly magnificent surroundings of York Minster. (Note: In the event, this campaign failed, and in keeping with British legal norms which hold that Christian burials excavated by archaeologists should be reburied in the nearest consecrated ground to the original grave. In the event, the dead King was interred in a chapel of Leicester Cathedral.)

Ormrod held numerous professional affiliations and memberships. These included Fellowship of the Royal Historical Society, Councillor of the Pipe Roll Society, trustee of the Richard III and Yorkist History Trust, and Fellow of the Society of Antiquaries. He had also been an editor of the Yorkshire Archaeological Press, the York Medieval Press, and the Parliament Rolls of Medieval England (PROME) project. He frequently collaborated with the Borthwick Institute for Archives, and was particularly interested in opening access to archives online. These projects included England's Immigrants, 1350–1550, where he was the principal investigator between 2012–2015, and which identified 70,000 immigrants to the country over the period. (Note: This established that approximately one person in every hundred was an immigrant to England at the time.) His research on migration led to changes to the national curriculum. It also led to the creation of the Runnymede Trust's Our Migration Story campaign and won The Guardian Award for Research Impact in 2019.

He is probably best known for his 700-page biography on Edward III for the Yale English Monarchs series. One of his last works, this has been described as "a compelling study", "a first rate example of historical investigation", and an "exceptionally complex project that had defeated several earlier scholars". His penultimate book, Women and Parliament in Later Medieval England, investigated petitions to parliament by female supplicants and established that far from being silent on issues such as rape and dower, (Note: The legal concept of dower had existed since the late twelfth century as a means of protecting a woman from being left landless if her husband died first. He would, when they married, assign certain estates to her — a dos nominata, or dower — usually a third of everything he was seised of. By the fifteenth century, the widow was deemed entitled to her dower; conversely, dower disputes were increasingly common, often centring on a widow's right to alienate her dower land. An increasing number of lawsuits involved litigation between dowagers and stepchildren, or in which both husband and wife were co-cited.) there were frequent submissions demanding change to the law and increased respect for women's rights in these and other areas.

In addition to his written output of at least nine books, 14 edited collections and well over 80 book chapters and articles, Ormrod acted as principal investigator for 19 major research projects with over £4 million in external funding, and supervised over 40 doctoral students and research assistants. July 2020 brought the publication of Monarchy, State, and Political Culture, a festschrift compiled in his honour by his colleagues Gwilym Dodd and Craig Taylor and presented to Ormrod by former students and colleagues. Dodd and Taylor also endowed the Mark Ormrod Prize, awarded annually to the best doctoral dissertation, on any medieval topic, at the University of York.

== Death ==
Ormrod entered into a civil partnership in 2006. He died of bowel cancer aged 62 on 2 August 2020; the proofs for his final monograph, Winner and Waster, were delivered to his publisher ten days previously.

== Select bibliography ==
As author

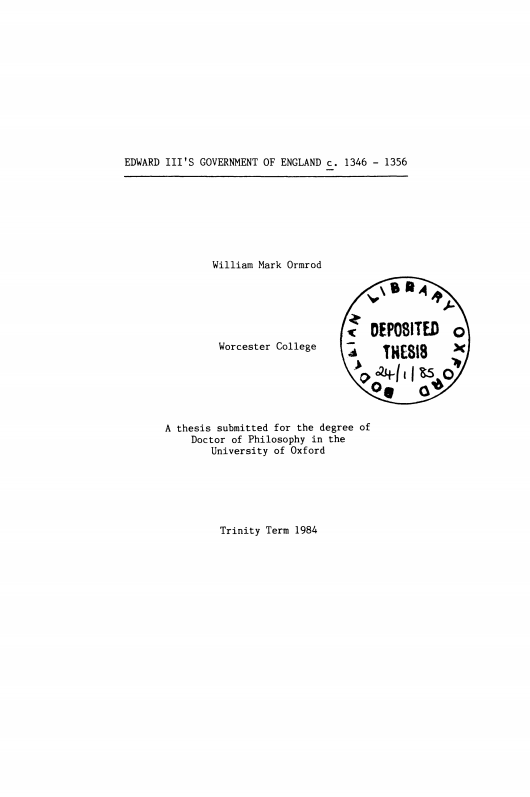
Ormrod thesis title page

- Winner and Waster and its Contexts: Chivalry, Law and Economics in Fourteenth-Century England, Cambridge, 2021.
- Women and Parliament in Later Medieval England, London, 2020.
- Edward III, London 2011 (English Monarchs series).
- Political Life in Medieval England, 1300–1450, Basingstoke / New York, 1995.
- The Reign Of Edward III: Crown and Political Society in England, 1327-1377, 1990
- England in the Fourteenth Century: Proceedings of the 1985 Harlaxton Symposium, Woodbridge, 1986.

As editor

- A Social History of England, 1200-1500, with Rosemary Horrox, Cambridge 2006.
- Fourteenth Century England, Woodbridge, 2004.
- Time in the Medieval World, with C. Humphrey, York / Woodbridge 2001.
- The Problem of Labour in Fourteenth Century England, with J. Bothwell and P.J.P. Goldberg, York / Woodbridge, 2000.
- The Evolution of English Justice: Law, Politics and Society in the Fourteenth Century, with Anthony Musson, Basingstoke / New York, 1999.

Websites

- England’s Immigrants 1330–1550, with Craig Taylor, Nicola McDonald, et al., York / London, Aug 2020.
- Parliament Rolls of Medieval England, with Chris Given-Wilson, Paul Brand, Anne Curry, Rosemary Horrox, G. Martin, and J.R.S. Phillips, Woodbridge / Leicester, 2005.
