= William Graham Stanton =

- Born: 18 August 1917; Brightside, Sheffield
- Died: 6 December 1999 (aged 82); York, North Yorkshire
- Occupation: Radio playwright
- Spouse: Dorothy Stanton
- Website: www.billstanton.co.uk

William Graham Stanton (18 August 1917 – 6 December 1999) was a British author and radio playwright.

== Early life ==
William Graham Stanton was born in Brightside, Sheffield, the seventh of eight children of John Stanton (a blacksmith) and his wife. His upbringing was in a working class Methodist tradition. His later writings about his experiences as a child described an upbringing rich in love, event and interest.

Stanton's brothers, George and Arthur, were sent to Sheffield University. The depression of the 1930s denied Stanton's family the means to help him through university, and instead Stanton had to settle for sponsorship from the Sheffield Education Committee to train to be a teacher. Shortly after he qualified in 1939, war was declared and Stanton volunteered for the Army. During the war, he met and married Dorothy Walton from Millhouses, and after the war they ran a private school together. Starting in 1954, he worked for the Vickers-owned English Steel Corporation as a sales representative. When he retired in 1980, it was as Area Marketing Manager for British Steel Corporation in Leeds. Throughout his life, Stanton wrote both prose and verse, most of which was unpublished.

== Writing career ==
In 1961, Stanton had a short story, It was never Albert, published by BBC Radio on their Morning Story series. It was the first of a series of twenty-one stories presented by the BBC throughout the sixties and early seventies.

In 1969 he had his first radio play success. The Compost Heap, a play about an old man who had become a burden to his family, was the first of a prodigious output of radio plays. The BBC produced and broadcast ten of Stanton's plays in 1971, more than any other author for that year. Stanton was delighted that they got Wilfred Pickles to play the principal character Albert Smith. He met Wilfred and they became firm friends. A young Tony Robinson also appeared in the play as the son-in-law Charlie.

Other plays were critically acclaimed. Milgrip's Progress was reviewed in the Listener, Twelve Tuesdays to Christmas was reviewed in the Listener. In 1977, Stanton's first book Treason For My Daily Bread was published. This was a fictional work around the assassination of John F. Kennedy based on a manuscript which was supposed to be written by a fictional character, Mikhail Mikhailovich Lebedev. Stanton also wrote two unpublished books, Fallout in Arden and Moss, a semiautobiographical work. Moss was posthumously published by Writers Tutorial Publications in 2024.

== Teaching and lecturing ==
After his successes, Stanton was invited to lecture at weekend courses for aspiring writers. As a teacher, Stanton wanted to inspire rather than instruct. He placed a great emphasis on doing rather than talking. He arranged "workshops" rather than "courses," and out of this came a number of projects. One was the "Workshop 74" at St. Mary's College, Durham, and another was the "Writer's Tutorial." He compiled much of his thinking on writing in a writers manual, published privately by Writers Tutorial, Write Through Rewrite. This was later revised and published as "Making Things Clear."

== Later life and death ==
In 1992, Stanton enrolled at the University of York to read English and American Literature. This gave him the opportunity to study Shakespeare properly. While at York he translated the Middle English poem Pearl for his long assignment. When he graduated in June 1996 with a two one at the age of 79, he was University of York's oldest graduate ever.

Stanton fell ill on 6 December 1999, and was taken to York District Hospital, where he died.

== BBC Radio Drama ==
1. MILGRIP'S PROGRESS Afternoon Theatre, BBC Radio 4 (First broadcast: Wed 5th Nov 1969, 15:00) Radio Times Listing
2. A THIN MAN SCREAMING, Afternoon Theatre, BBC Radio 4 (First broadcast: Wed 27th Oct 1971, 15:00) R.T. Listing
3. TWELVE TUESDAYS TO CHRISTMAS, Afternoon Theatre, BBC Radio 4 (First broadcast: Wed 5th Jan 1972, 15:00) R.T. Listing
4. THE COMPOST HEAP, Afternoon Theatre, BBC Radio 4 (First broadcast: Fri 13th Oct 1972, 15:00) R.T. Listing
5. DAYSPRING IS AT HAND, Midweek Theatre, BBC Radio 4 (First broadcast: Wed 24th Oct 1973, 20:15) R.T. Listing
6. A PLUG FOR THE CABINET, Just Before Midnight, BBC Radio 4 (First broadcast: Sat 24th Mar 1979, 23:45) R.T. Listing

== BBC Radio Short Stories ==
1. IT WAS NEVER ALBERT, Morning Story, BBC Light Programme (First broadcast: Tue 11th Sep 1962, 11:00) Radio Times Listing
2. BLACKCURRANT FOR THE SACRAMENT, Morning Story, BBC Light Programme (First broadcast: Fri 26th May 1967, 11:00) R.T. Listing
3. A RIGHT GOOD WILL, Morning Story, BBC Light Programme (First broadcast: Fri 28th Jul 1967, 11:00) R.T. Listing
4. MAKE IT THREE, Morning Story, BBC Light Programme (First broadcast: Wed 16th Aug 1967, 11:00) R.T. Listing
5. WE'LL NEVER GO THERE AGAIN, Morning Story, BBC Radio 2 (First broadcast: Fri 10th Nov 1967, 11:00) R.T. Listing
6. EVER AT MY BACK, Morning Story, BBC Radio 2 (First broadcast: Fri 12th Jan 1968, 11:00) R.T. Listing
7. ACT OF FAITH, Morning Story, BBC Radio 2 (First broadcast: Fri 17th May 1968, 11:00) R.T. Listing
8. THE CHESTNUT FILLY, Morning Story, BBC Radio 2 (First broadcast: Wed 12th Jun 1968, 11:00) R.T. Listing
9. PAPA JORGENSEN, Morning Story, BBC Radio 2 (First broadcast: Fri 28th Jun 1968, 11:00) R.T. Listing
10. PLAYBACK, Morning Story, BBC Radio 2 (First broadcast: Wed 2nd Oct 1968, 11:00) R.T. Listing
11. FIVE MILES TO PARADISE, Morning Story, BBC Radio 2 (First broadcast: Fri 3rd Jan 1969, 11:00) R.T. Listing
12. A MOST BEAUTIFUL PUPPY, Morning Story, BBC Radio 2 (First broadcast: Wed 2nd Apr 1969, 11:00) R.T. Listing
13. BETTER A DISH OF ILLUSION, Morning Story, BBC Radio 2 (First broadcast: Fri 19th Sep 1969, 11:00) R.T. Listing
14. LOOK THOUGH CHARACTER, Morning Story, BBC Radio 2 (First broadcast: Fri 17th Apr 1970, 10:30) R.T. Listing
15. AND THOU BESIDE ME, Morning Story, BBC Radio 2 (First broadcast: Fri 15th Jan 1971, 10:30) R.T. Listing3A59.999Z#top
16. THE IDOL, Morning Story, BBC Radio 4 (First broadcast: Fri 30th Nov 1973, 10:45) R.T. Listing
17. A LETTER TO MISS GOODBODDY, Morning Story, BBC Radio 4 (First broadcast: Fri 26th Aug 1977, 10:45) R.T, Listing
18. A SORT OF JUBILEE, Morning Story, BBC Radio 4 (First broadcast: Mon 5th Dec 1977, 10:45) R.T. Listing
