= Department of History, University of York =

Department of the University of York, England

- Type: Academic department
- Established: 1963
- Parent institution: University of York
- Head of Department: Professor Oleg Benesch
- Academic staff: 48
- Total staff: 70
- Undergraduates: 795
- Postgraduates: 100
- Location: York, Yorkshire
- Website: www.york.ac.uk/history/

The Department of History at the University of York, England, provides undergraduate and post-graduate courses across a range of disciplines. It is one of the six original departments that the university began with when it open in 1963. It is based at Vanbrugh College. The department has 900 students.

== History ==
The department began teaching in 1963, with Gerald Aylmer as the first professor of history and head of department. His innovative approach to syllabus and examination helped to establish the university with a reputation for forming graduates ready for export to Oxford and Cambridges colleges. The deconstructionist decision to remove distinctions between topics such as European and English history was viewed with interest by external commentators. The Oxbridge tradition, and the accompanying commitment seminars, was continued by Norman Hampson.

== Courses ==
Bachelor of Arts courses tend to take three years, although a placement year can also be taken. The first year includes three core modules to establish an understanding of the historical concepts of power, societal developments, and knowledge, and two historical modules to understand the academic approach to evidence and methodologies. There is also an optional module to carry out individual research into an historical period, or the alternative of choosing an elective module. The second year has two further core modules, encompassing public history and the philosophy of history, and four optional modules. In third year a special subject module is studied for the whole year for in-depth study of a topic or process, alongside two comparative modules. At the end of the third year an 8,000 word dissertation is also submitted.

Masters courses take one year full-time or two years part-time. They can be taken in Medieval History, Early Modern History, Modern History, Public History, or Historical Studies. They all consist of core and optional modules, as well as a 14,000-16,000 word dissertation.

The postgraduate courses offered are Doctor of Philosophy (PhD) and Master of Philosophy (MPhil). The PhD takes three-four years full-time or six years part-time, while the MPhil takes two years full-time or four years part-time.

== Organisation ==
=== Heads of Department ===
1963-1978 - Gerald Aylmer

1978-19?? - Norman Hampson

1996-2003 - Dr Allen Warren

2001, 2003-2007 - Professor Mark Ormrod

2008-2011 - Bill Sheils

2011-2015 - Stuart Carroll

2024-present - Professor Oleg Benesch

== Popular culture ==
- The book Will and Circumstance is dedicated to the department.
