= Felicity Riddy =

British literary historian

Felicity Riddy (born 7 June 1940) is an academic, author and specialist in late-medieval English and Scottish literature.

Educated at Auckland University College/the University of Auckland (BA/MA, 1961/1962), New Zealand and the University of Oxford (BPhil, 1965), Riddy taught at Ahmadu Bello University (Nigeria) and the University of Stirling (Scotland).

She then joined the Department of English and Related Literature at the University of York in 1988, becoming a professor in 1991. She was Director of the university's interdisciplinary Centre for Medieval Studies in the mid-1990s, became a Pro-Vice-Chancellor in 2000 and then Deputy Vice-Chancellor from 2002 until her retirement in 2007.

She has published widely on medieval women's writing, Arthurian romance, devotional literature and Older Scots poetry. Her interests in urban culture (stimulated by York's Centre for Medieval Studies inter-disciplinary urban Household Research Group) have produced articles on urban courtesy texts, romances, devotional reading and domestic authority.

Notable students of Riddy include Kim Phillips, professor of history at the University of Auckland.

== Selected works ==
- Sir Thomas Malory (1987)
- An anthology of Longer Scottish Poems, 1375–1650 (1987) (with Priscilla Bawcutt)
- Macmillan Literary Anthologies, I, Old and Middle English Literature (London, 1989 (with M. J. Alexander).
- Regionalism in Late Medieval Manuscripts and Texts (1991) (ed.)
- John Hardyng in Search of the Grail, in Arturus Rex, ed. by W. Van Hoecke (Leuven, 1991), pp. 419–29.
- Glastonbury, Joseph of Arimathea and the Grail in John Hardyng’s Chronicle, in The Archaeology and History of Glastonbury Abbey, ed. by Lesley Abrams and James P. Carley (Woodbridge, 1991), pp. 317–31.
- Selected Poems of Henryson and Dunbar (1992) (with Priscilla Bawcutt)
- Co-editor of the annual Arthurian Literature (1993–1998)(with James P. Carley)
- John Hardyng’s Chronicle and the Wars of the Roses, Arthurian Literature, 12 (1996), 91–108.
- A feminist reading of Henryson's 'Testament of Cresseid (1997, repr. 1999).
- Prestige, Authority and Power in Late Medieval Manuscripts and Texts (2000) (ed.)
- Looking closely: authority and intimacy in the late-medieval urban home in Medieval Women and Power Revisited: Challenging the Master Narrative, edited by M. Kowaleski and M. Erler (2003)
- Youth in the Middle Ages (2004) (co-edited with P.J.P. Goldberg)
- Temporary Virginity and the Everyday Body: Le Bone Florence of Rome and Bourgeois Self-Making in Pulp Fictions, edited by N. McDonald (2004)
- The moral household in The Medieval Household in Christian Europe c. 850-c. 1550, edited by C. Beattie, A. Maslovic and S. Rees Jones (2004)

== Sources ==
- Brief Academic Staff Biographies, University of York
