= Kim Phillips (historian) =

Professor of history in New Zealand

- Born: 1950

Academic background
- Education: University of York, University of Melbourne
- Thesis: The medieval maiden : young womanhood in late medieval England (1997)
- Doctoral advisor: Jeremy Goldberg, Felicity Riddy

Kim M. Phillips is an Australian–New Zealand academic historian, and is a full professor of history at the University of Auckland, specialising in gender, sexuality and women in the medieval period.

== Academic career ==
Phillips comes from Melbourne, Australia, and completed her undergraduate education at the University of Melbourne. She won a Commonwealth Scholarship to carry out postgraduate work at the University of York. She completed her PhD titled The medieval maiden: young womanhood in late medieval England there in 1997. Her doctoral work was supervised by Jeremy Goldberg and Felicity Riddy. Phillips then joined the faculty of the University of Auckland in 1997, rising to full professor in 2021. As of 2024 she is the Head of the School of Humanities.

Phillips focuses on researching women, gender and sexuality in the medieval period. She has a particular interest in mermaids and their evolution alongside ideas about the female body in medieval literature.

In 2013 Phillips was invited to give the Keith Sinclair lecture at the University of Auckland, where she spoke on Strange encounters: Europeans in Asia before the modern era. Phillips received an Early Career Research Excellence Award from Auckland, and a Faculty of Arts Teaching Excellence Award. In 2015 she was nominated for the Jerry Bentley Prize in World History from the American Historical Association, for her book Before Orientalism. She was a plenary speaker at the Medieval Association of the Pacific and the Medieval Academy of America joint meeting in 2020. She was the president of the Australian and New Zealand Association for Medieval and Early Modern Studies from 2005 to 2009.

== Selected works ==
=== Authored and edited books ===
- Phillips, Kim, ed. (2 April 2015). A Cultural History of Women in the Middle Ages. Bloomsbury. ISBN 9781350995826.
- Phillips, Kim M. (2014). Before Orientalism: Asian Peoples and Cultures in European Travel Writing, 1245-1510. Penn Press. ISBN 978-0-8122-0894-8. JSTOR j.ctt5hjknr.
- Reay, Barry; Phillips, Kim M., eds. (September 2011). Sex Before Sexuality: A Premodern History. Wiley. ISBN 978-0-745-62523-2.
- Bailey, Lisa Kaaren; Diggelmann, Lindsay; Phillips, Kim M., eds. (2009). Old worlds, new worlds: European cultural encounters, c. 1000-c.1750. Late Medieval and Early Modern Studies. Vol. 18. Turnhout: Brepols Publishers. doi:10.1484/M.LMEMS-EB.6.09070802050003050301030208. ISBN 978-2-503-53132-8.
- Phillips, Kim M. (2003). Medieval Maidens: Young Women and Gender in England, 1270-1540. Manchester University Press. ISBN 978-0-7190-5964-3.
- Phillips, Kim M.; Reay, Barry, eds. (2002). Sexualities in History: A Reader. Routledge. doi:10.4324/9780203951170. ISBN 978-1-135-30476-8.
- Lewis, Katherine J.; Menuge, Noel James; Phillips, Kim M., eds. (1999). Young Medieval Women. New York: St. Martin's.

=== Journal articles ===
- Phillips, Kim (2005). "The invisible man: body and ritual in a fifteenth-century noble household". Journal of Medieval History. 31 (2): 143–162. doi:10.1016/j.jmedhist.2005.03.003. Wikidata Q64869503.
- Phillips, Kim (2000). "Bodily Walls, Windows, and Doors: The Politics of Gesture in Late Fifteenth-Century English Books for Women". Medieval Women – Texts and Contexts in Late Medieval Britain. pp. 185–198. doi:10.1484/m.mwtc-eb.3.3642. ISBN 978-2-503-50979-2. Wikidata Q125879661.
- Phillips, Kim (2016). "Travel, Writing, and the Global Middle Ages". History Compass. 14 (3): 81–92. doi:10.1111/hic3.12301. Wikidata Q125879662.
- Phillips, Kim (2007). "Masculinities and the Medieval English Sumptuary Laws". Gender & History. 19 (1): 22–42. doi:10.1111/j.1468-0424.2007.00462.x. Wikidata Q125879664.
