= Jeremy Goldberg =

English historian

Peter Jeremy Piers Goldberg (born 1958) is an English historian. He is Reader in Medieval History at the University of York. Goldberg was educated at the University of York and at the University of Cambridge. His main interest lies within the social and cultural history of late medieval England, in particular women's and gender history. Among his published books are Women, Work and Life Cycle in a Medieval Economy (1992), Women in England c. 1275–1525: Documentary Sources (1995) and Medieval England: A Social History 1250–1550 (2004). He has also edited several books, including Women in Medieval English Society (1997) and Richard Scrope: Archbishop, Rebel, Martyr (2007).

Notable doctoral students of Goldberg include Kim Phillips, professor of history at the University of Auckland.
