= Siege of Hennebont =

1342 battle of the War of Breton Succession

Coordinates: 47°48′14″N 3°16′48″W

- Part of the Breton Civil War
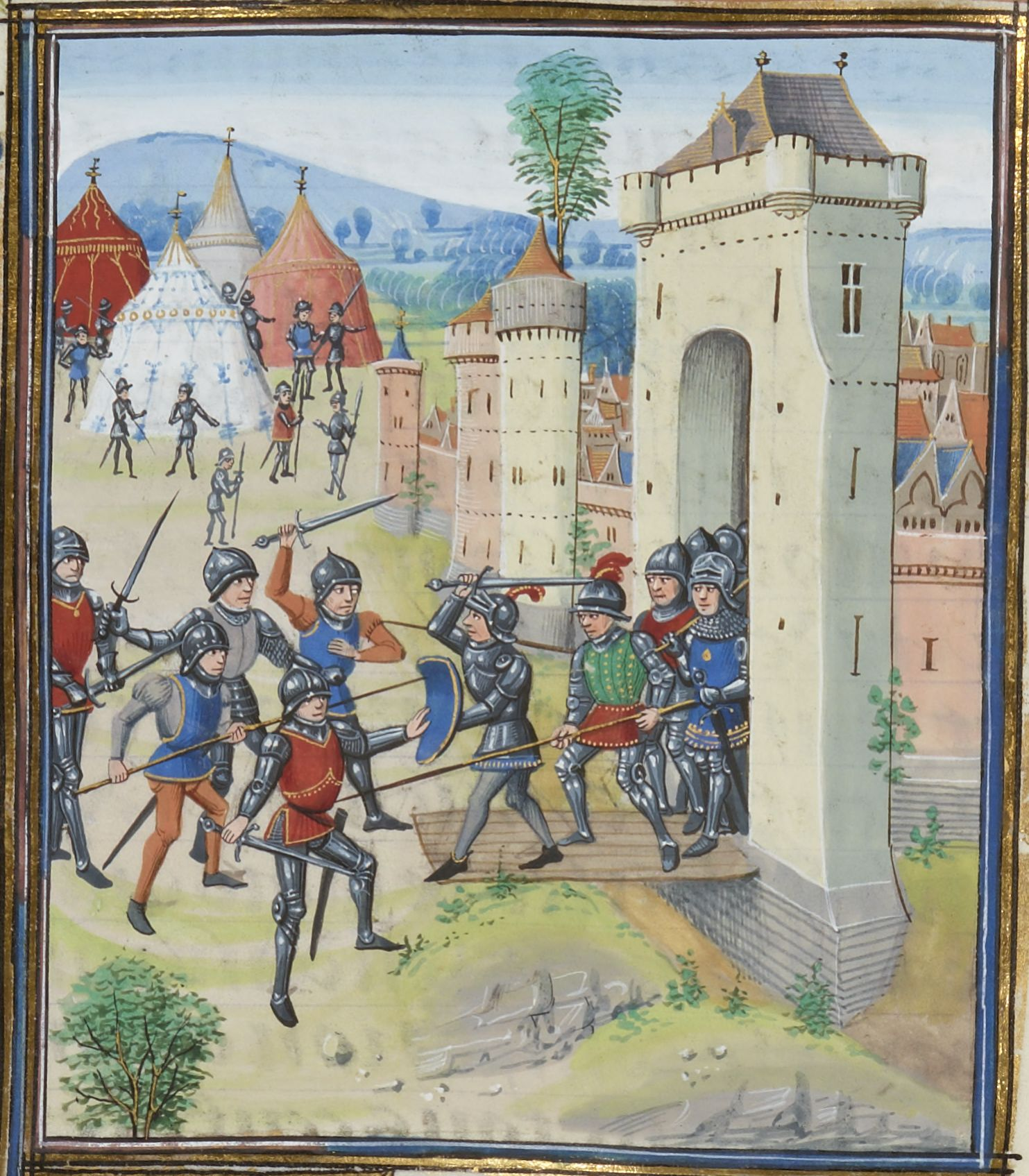
- An incident during the siege from a near-contemporary manuscript
Date	Late May – late June 1342
Location	Brittany
Result	Montfort victory

Belligerents
House of Blois; France	House of Montfort; England

Commanders and leaders
Charles of Blois	Joanna of Montfort

The siege of Hennebont took place between late May and late June 1342 when the forces of Charles of Blois conducted an unsuccessful siege of the fortified port of Hennebont, commanded by Joanna of Montfort. (Note: Joanna of Montfort is also referred to in some sources as Joan or Joanna of Flanders.) The conflict was a part of the Breton Civil War, a dynastic dispute between two claimants to the Duchy of Brittany which had broken out the previous year. A complicating factor was the pre-existing Hundred Years' War between France and England. Philip VI of France was supporting Charles of Blois, his nephew; Edward III of England had promised military assistance to Joanna, the wife of the rival claimant, John of Montfort. A truce between France and England was in place when the siege started but it expired in June.

Charles's French army overran eastern Brittany and captured John of Montfort. Joanna took up the cause and concentrated her resources in Hennebont. In late May 1342 Charles moved on the town. On arrival part of his army advanced against orders and attacked some of the town's defenders who were formed up outside its gate. More troops were pulled into this fight before the French were pushed back in a disorderly retreat. The Montfortists pursued, inflicting many casualties and burning the French camp. Two days later the French launched a series of better-planned assaults, but all were repulsed. The main French force moved on, leaving a detachment to attempt to starve the town into surrender. In late June, after a small English force had reinforced the town by sea, this too left. In July Charles was strongly reinforced and returned; the Montfortists abandoned Hennebont and redeployed further west, hoping for English reinforcements

== Background ==
Brittany was a province of France. Although the dukes of Brittany were vassals of the French kings, they governed the duchy as all but independent rulers. Nevertheless, when the Hundred Years' War broke out in 1337 between France and England the Duke of Brittany, John III, fought alongside his feudal lord the King of France, Philip VI. John died on 30 April 1341, leaving a disputed succession: both his niece, Joan of Penthièvre, and his younger half-brother, John of Montfort, claimed the duchy. Joan was married to Charles of Blois, a well-connected and militarily oriented French nobleman who was also a nephew of King Philip. John had the stronger legal claim but the aristocracy and clergy knew little about him and mostly preferred Charles. John's support came mostly from the lower levels of society in the countryside, and the bourgeoisie in the towns.

Starting in early June 1341 John seized most of the fortified places in Brittany and by mid-August he had all but made good his claim to the duchy. Philip initially disregarded the situation but, correctly suspecting that John was negotiating with the English, had Charles declared the rightful heir on 7 September. The French king liked the idea of the new duke being related to him as it would bring the traditionally semi-autonomous province more firmly under royal control. He was willing to commit considerable military resources to achieve this and despatched an army commanded by his eldest son, John, Duke of Normandy, to support Charles. This led to the outbreak of the Breton Civil War.

== French and English intervention ==
A map of Brittany, with modern administrative boundaries, showing the locations of some of the places mentioned in the text

In the six months beginning September 1341, the French army overran all of eastern Brittany apart from Rennes and captured John of Montfort. John surrendered on the granting of a safe conduct to Paris and back by John of Normandy, who escorted him. In Paris Philip proposed to John that he repudiate all claim to Brittany and his possessions there in favour of Charles of Blois, receiving an annuity and land in France in exchange. John declined, at which Philip withdrew his son's promised safe conduct and had John imprisoned. John's wife, Joanna of Montfort, was in Rennes with their two-year-old son, also named John, and the ducal treasury when news of John's capture arrived. Modern historians consider her to have been an energetic and effective leader, and she acted decisively and aggressively. She recalled the field army from western Brittany, joined it with some of the troops in Rennes and took command. She stormed the town of Redon and then moved to Hennebont, a small but strongly walled town with access to the sea. From there Joanna retained control of most of western Brittany and set up her infant son as the faction's figurehead and heir to his father's claim to the duchy.

At the time the Hundred Years' War between France and England had been underway for five years; therefore Joanna despatched her senior counsellor, Amaury of Clisson, to Edward III in England with a large sum in cash to encourage English military intervention. The Montfortist cause was soon being supported by Edward III as an extension of the war with France. This was the start of Edward's "provincial strategy", by which he sided with French vassals of Philip in their disagreements with him: this promoted Edward's claim to be the rightful king of France and potentially created military allies. Strategically Edward had the opportunity to set up a ruler in Brittany at least partially under his control, which would provide access to Breton ports, greatly aiding England's naval war and giving ready entry to France for English armies. However, English reinforcements took a long time to reach Brittany. This was partly because the Truce of Espléchin was in force between France and England. Ostensibly halting all fighting, in practice it prevented either country from deploying their main field armies, but was otherwise ill observed. It was due to expire on 24 June 1342.

== Siege ==
On 15 April Charles moved on Rennes. The populace seized the commander Joanna had left in charge and surrendered to the French army. A little later a small English force of 234 men under Sir Walter Mauny arrived at Brest in western Brittany. They were despatched ahead of the main English force to garrison the main Breton ports; Mauny was probably under orders not to attack French forces until after the truce expired. Edward planned to land in Brittany himself in June with a substantial force, but had extreme difficulty in assembling ships. (Note: By English common law, the Crown was required to compensate the owners of ships impressed into service, but in practice the king paid little and late, which caused shipowners to be reluctant to answer summonses to arms.) Mauny's force skirmished in the west to little effect, while Charles detached a force to besiege Vannes and marched the rest of his army on Hennebont.

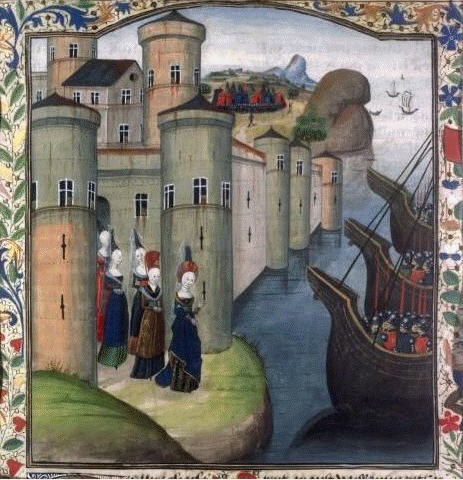
Joanna and her ladies greeting the English relief force

The town contained a large garrison and morale was high. The French army arrived in late May. Some of the Spanish and Italian mercenaries pushed forward against orders and engaged a group of defenders formed up in front of the town gates. Charles's men got the worst of this fight but were unable to retreat; he was forced to send more men forward in small groups as they became available in an attempt to temporarily push back the Montfortists and allow his impetuous troops to retreat. The Montfortists also fed additional troops into the fight through the gate and Charles's attempt to facilitate an organised retreat failed; the whole attack was thrown back in disorder with many killed. The Montfortists pursued the French and burnt down most of their freshly established camp. According to a contemporary account Joanna rode through the suburbs in full armour encouraging the fighting men. She was later given the soubriquet "Flame of Brittany".

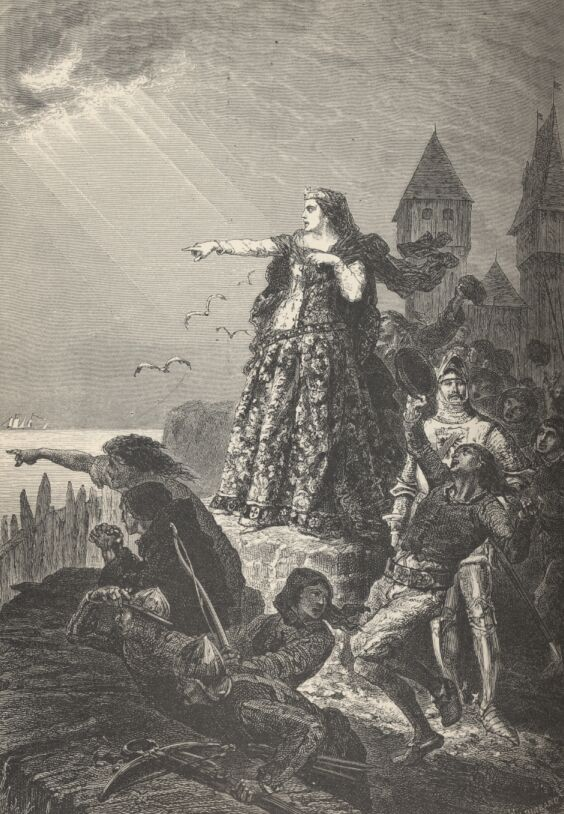
Joanna of Flanders spots the English fleet arriving to relieve Hennebont, 1342. Illus. from François Guizot's History of France, 1869

The next day Charles probed the town's defences and on the second day after arriving he repeatedly ordered assaults on the town; they were all repulsed with losses. In early June the French dug in for a regular siege, in the hope that starvation would force the town's surrender. Charles moved his main force to Auray, leaving a small force of mercenaries, mostly Spanish, and several siege engines to carry on the siege at Hennebont under the command of Louis of Spain, an expatriate Spaniard who had previously been the admiral of France. Charles promised pardons and financial incentives in an attempt to win the Montfortists back to France. Some were inclined to seek what terms they could, but the majority of Joanna's council held firm. The betrayal by Philip of the safe conduct given to John of Montfort by Duke John caused a deep distrust of such pledges. At some point in June Mauny took his force up the estuary to resupply and reinforce Hennebont. By late June the besiegers had broken up their engines and left. Charles also pulled back from his siege of Auray.

== Aftermath ==
The French mobilised more than 10,000 men, possibly many more, in late June for the campaigning season and most of them were allocated to renewing the offensive in Brittany. By early July their impact was felt: the Montfortists in Auray ran out of food and abandoned the town at night, Vannes agreed terms of surrender and fell to the French, and many other places also went over to the French. Joanna considered her position in Hennebont unsustainable and left it for Brest, where by August Charles was again besieging her. More than 2,000 English troops landed at Brest on 18 August, relieving the town and causing Charles to withdraw his army from western Brittany. The English then marched on Morlaix, a town on the north coast with strong fortifications and a secure harbour 50 kilometres (30 mi) from Brest, and besieged it. Charles was now aware that his force greatly outnumbered the English and he attempted to relieve Morlaix, but was defeated on 30 September at the battle of Morlaix. (Note: Morlaix was the first major land battle of both the Breton Civil War and the Hundred Years War.) Edward III landed in Brest with a further 3,000 men on 26 October, marched to and besieged Vannes, only to agree the Truce of Malestroit on 19 January 1343. Hostilities did not recommence until June 1345. Joanna travelled to England, took no further part in the war and died in September 1374. She stayed in Tickhill Castle and it was given out at the time that she had gone insane; this is accepted by most historians although it has been suggested that she was confined for political reasons, rather than because of mental illness. Her husband predeceased her in 1345.

The Breton Civil War continued as a disjointed and inconclusive series of sieges, skirmishes and truces, frequently as part of the Hundred Years' War. The eastern and southern parts of Brittany were mostly held by the French, who continued to strongly support Charles of Blois, while western and northern Brittany continued to be largely Montfort or English controlled. Charles of Blois was killed in 1364 at the Battle of Auray and his army decisively defeated. The next year his widow, Joan of Penthièvre, signed the Treaty of Guérande, recognising John of Montfort's son as Duke of Brittany, which ended the war. The Hundred Years' War continued until 1453, when it ended in a French victory.

== Notes, citations and sources ==
=== Sources ===
- Allmand, Christopher (2001). The Hundred Years' War: England and France at War, c. 1300–c. 1450. Cambridge: Cambridge University Press. ISBN 978-0-521-31923-2.
- Burne, Alfred (1999). The Crecy War. Ware, Hertfordshire: Wordsworth Editions. ISBN 978-1-84022-210-4.
- Curry, Anne (2002). The Hundred Years' War 1337–1453. Essential Histories. Oxford: Osprey Publishing. ISBN 978-1-84176-269-2.
- Cushway, Graham (2011). Edward III and the War at Sea. Woodbridge, Suffolk: Boydell Press. ISBN 978-1-84383-621-6.
- DeVries, Kelly (1998). Infantry Warfare in the Early Fourteenth Century. Woodbridge, Suffolk: Boydell Press. ISBN 978-0-85115-567-8.
- Graham-Goering, Erika (2020). Princely Power in Late Medieval France: Jeanne de Penthièvre and the War for Brittany. Cambridge: Cambridge University Press. ISBN 978-1-108-80554-4.
- Jones, Michael (1988). The Creation of Brittany: A Late Medieval State. London: Hambledon Press. ISBN 978-0-907628-80-4.
- Jones, Michael (1999). "War and Fourteenth-Century France". In Curry, Anne; Hughes, Michael (eds.). Arms, Armies and Fortifications in the Hundred Years War. Woodbridge, Suffolk: Boydell & Brewer. pp. 103–120. ISBN 978-0-85115-755-9.
- Neillands, Robin (2001). The Hundred Years War. London; New York: Routledge. ISBN 978-0-415-26131-9.
- Mortimer, Ian (2007). The Perfect King: The Life of Edward III, Father of the English Nation. London: Pimlico. ISBN 978-1-84413-530-1.
- Prestwich, Michael (1980). The Three Edwards: War and State in England 1272–1377. New Haven: Book Club. ISBN 978-0-297-77730-4. OCLC 1302632810.
- Ormrod, W. Mark (1990). Edward III. New Haven: Yale University Press. ISBN 978-0-300-11910-7. OCLC 1039705847.
- Sarpy, Julie (2019). Joanna of Flanders: Heroine and Exile. Stroud, Gloucestershire: Amberley Publishing. ISBN 978-1-4456-8855-8.
- Sumption, Jonathan (1990). Trial by Battle. The Hundred Years' War. Vol. I. London: Faber and Faber. ISBN 978-0-571-20095-5.
- Visser, Nils; Snijder, Willeke (2014). "The Flame of Britanny: Jeanne de Flandres". Medieval Warfare. 4 (2): 33–38. JSTOR 48578335.
- Wagner, John A. (2006). Encyclopedia of the Hundred Years War. Woodbridge, Suffolk: Greenwood. ISBN 978-0-313-32736-0.
- Williamson, James Alexander (1944). The Evolution of England: A Commentary on the Facts. Oxford: Clarendon Press. OCLC 984703073.
