= Initial campaign of the War of the Breton Succession =

1341–1342 French military invasion

French invasion of Brittany
- Part of the Breton Civil War
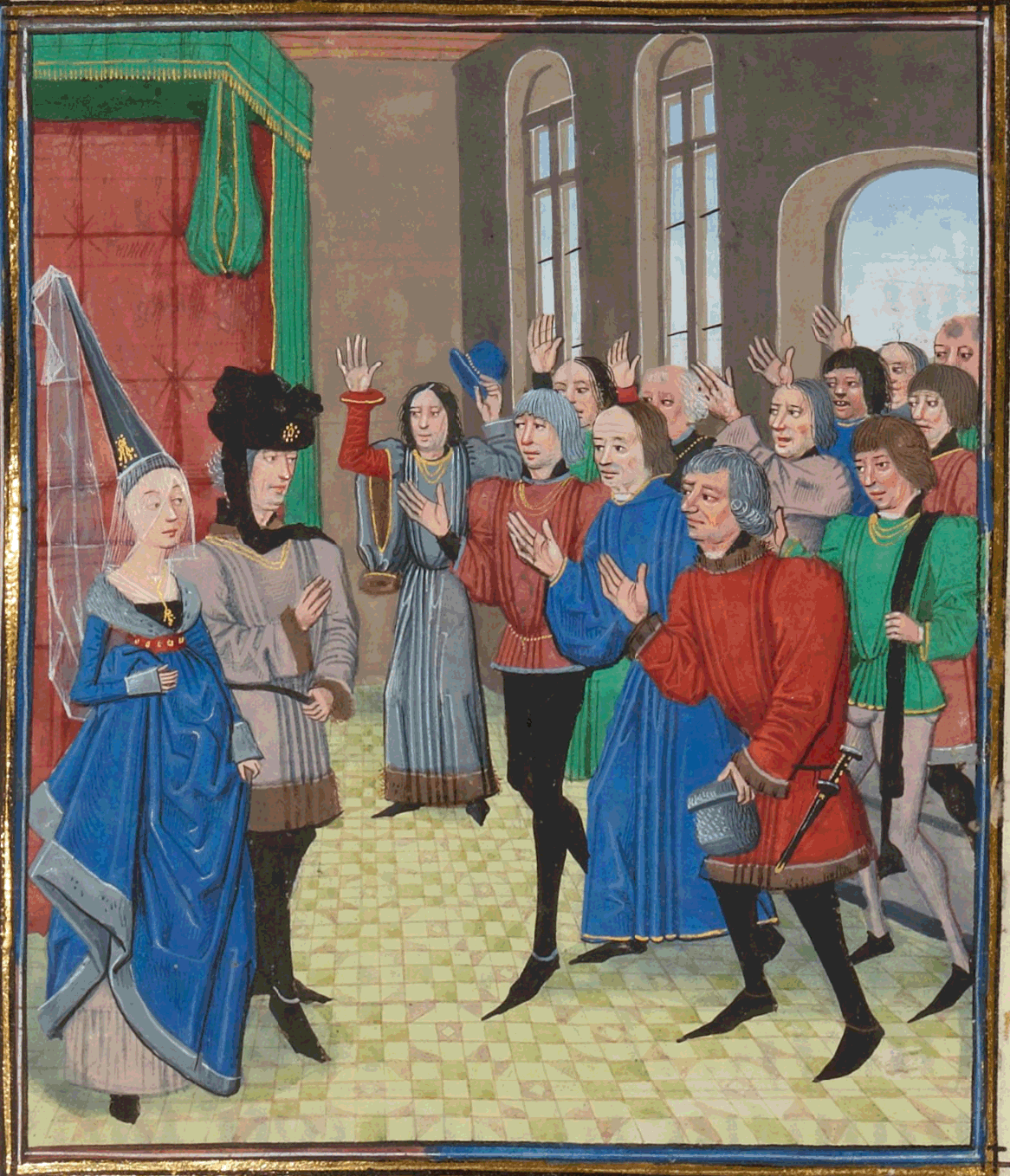
- Citizens of Nantes paying homage to John of Montfort and Joanna of Flanders
| Date | May 1341 – February 1342 |
| Location | Duchy of Brittany |
| Result | Inconclusive |

Belligerents
| House of Blois; France | House of Montfort |

Commanders and leaders
| Charles of Blois; John, Duke of Normandy | John of Montfort; Joanna of Flanders |

Strength
| 7,000+ | Unknown |

The initial campaign of the Breton Civil War took place in 1341 when a French royal army intervened in a succession war between two claimants to the Duchy of Brittany. Brittany was a province of France, but although the dukes of Brittany were vassals of the French kings they governed the duchy as independent rulers. When Duke John III (r. 1312–1341) died childless on 30 April 1341, title to the duchy was claimed by both his niece, Joan of Penthièvre, and his younger half-brother, John of Montfort. Joan's claim was exercised through her husband, Charles of Blois, a nephew of the king of France, Philip VI (r. 1328–1350). A complicating factor was the ongoing Hundred Years' War between France and England that had broken out in 1337. A truce was in place which was due to expire in June 1341 but was extended to June 1342.

It was generally assumed that Joan's claim would prevail and that Charles would become the new duke, but John acted quickly and installed friendly garrisons in most of the towns and castles of Brittany by August. He discussed the possibility of a military treaty with English emissaries but made no move towards effecting one. Rumours of these discussions reached Philip, causing him to turn against John and in September Charles was recognised as the new duke. John refused to give way and Philip sent an army to Brittany to impose Charles.

Within a month John had been defeated and was a prisoner. His wife, Joanna of Flanders, sent the ducal treasury west to Brest, took command of her husband's field army, stormed the town of Redon and moved to the small but strongly walled town of Hennebont. She despatched a senior counsellor to encourage English military intervention, set up her two-year-old son, also named John, as the faction's figurehead and heir to his father's claim to the duchy, and waited on events. The war lasted 24 years, frequently as a part of the Hundred Years' War.

== Background ==
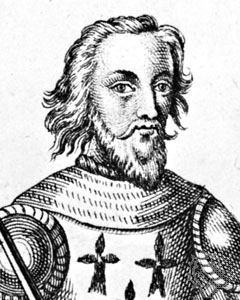
Charles of Blois as envisaged in 1621

In the 14th century, Brittany was a province of France, but although the dukes of Brittany were vassals of the French kings they governed the duchy as independent rulers. Nevertheless, when the Hundred Years' War broke out in 1337 between France and England the Duke of Brittany, John III (r. 1312–1341), fought alongside his feudal lord the King of France, Philip VI (r. 1328–1350). John III died on 30 April 1341, leaving a disputed succession; both his niece, Joan of Penthièvre, and his younger half brother, John of Montfort, claimed the dukedom. Joan was the only child of John III's dead younger brother Guy, and was married to Charles of Blois, a well-connected and militarily oriented French nobleman who was also a nephew of the King of France. Complicating the legal situation – which was unprecedented in Breton law – John III seems to have on separate occasions formally promised the succession to both John of Montfort and Charles of Blois.

John had the stronger legal claim but the aristocracy and clergy knew little about him and mostly preferred Charles' claim. What support John had came largely from the lower levels of society, especially in the towns. It was widely accepted in Brittany that Charles would inherit. John, encouraged by his wife, Joanna of Flanders, took 200 men and seized Nantes, the most important town in Brittany, shortly after John III's funeral. He then took control of the Breton treasury and unsuccessfully wooed the great men of Brittany. In early June 1341 John moved on to an alternative plan: to take control of as much of Brittany as he could, and so encourage Philip to confirm him as the new duke to avoid possible conflict. John left Nantes to secure Champtoceaux, a large ducal castle about 30 kilometres (19 mi) to the north east on the south bank of the River Loire. It protected Nantes from enemies approaching from central or northern France and John garrisoned it with mercenaries.

John continued on to Rennes, the second-largest town in Brittany and its capital. It had strong walls and a large garrison, but after a brief and fumbled defence the town surrendered. Saint-Aubin-du-Cormier, a strong fortification defending the approach to Rennes from Paris, followed suit, as did the walled town of Dinan. Having subdued most of eastern Brittany – the richest and most populous part of the duchy – John returned to Nantes, then during July and early August overran most of the towns of southern and western Brittany. Few were well-fortified or stoutly defended and there was only fighting at Brest. By mid-August, John had all but made good his claim to the duchy. Philip disregarded the situation, ignoring requests for assistance from Charles of Blois. John's loyalty at this point was unquestioned and so expelling him by force when he had a strong legal case was politically unappealing, and ran the risk of driving him into an alliance with the English. Philip passed the question of who should succeed John III to the Parlement of Paris – a judicial rather than legislative body – where deliberations were liable to be long drawn out.

== English intervention ==
A map of Brittany, with modern administrative boundaries, showing the locations of some of the places mentioned in the text

While these events were taking place, the Truce of Espléchin was in force between France and England. Ostensibly halting all fighting, in practice it prevented either country from deploying their main field armies, but was otherwise ill observed. The truce was originally due to expire on 24 June 1341, but was extended on 9 June to 29 August, and on 10 August to 14 September. Fighting on a large scale continued in south-west France and at sea as both sides prepared to mobilise major forces once the truce expired. Edward III of England sent an emissary to John of Montfort, who held discussions with him on 10 July regarding John recognising Edward as king of France in exchange for Edward's recognising John's claim to Brittany and providing military support. John equivocated: he wished to have support for his claim in the event of Philip's deciding in favour of Charles of Blois, but was not ready to cause a break with Philip if it could be avoided.

Rumours of these negotiations reached Philip VI, causing him to come down firmly in favour of Charles of Blois as the new duke of Brittany, but he did not announce it. Instead he planned for an armed seizure of Brittany and accelerated the hearing of the case by the Parlement of Paris. John was summoned to Paris as a witness, arriving in late August. While attending on Philip VI it became clear that he had lost the French King's confidence. In early September John fled from Paris for Nantes. On 7 September the Parlement formally decided that Charles of Blois was the legitimate successor to John III. Once the issue was definitively decided in favour of Charles, his nephew, the idea of bringing the traditionally semi-autonomous province more firmly under royal control was attractive to Philip; he was willing to commit considerable military resources, which were available due to the truce with England.

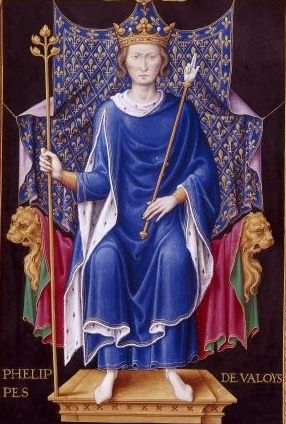
Philip VI of France

By late August 1341 Edward III had decided against an early renewal of the war. In particular the lack of a response from John and the knowledge that he had left Brittany for Paris seemed to rule out an otherwise potentially inviting opportunity. Accordingly, on 12 September 1341 the Truce of Espléchin was extended again, this time for nine months, to 24 June 1342. Edward and his council agreed that the English army would be disbanded for the winter and the fleet paid off; while this was taking place representatives arrived from John announcing that he had broken with Philip VI and that as soon as military support arrived in Brittany he would swear fealty to Edward III as his liege lord and the rightful king of France. Edward saw great possibilities in the situation and in early October agreed a formal alliance with John, allocated £10,000 for military expenditure, (Note: For comparison, Edward III's annual income was often less than £50,000.) gave orders to attempt to reassemble the recently disbanded fleet, and allocated a small force of men to sail in it, hopefully – if optimistically – by early November. This was the start of Edward's "provincial strategy", by which he sided with French vassals of Philip in their disagreements with him: this promoted Edward's claim to be the rightful king of France and potentially created military allies. Strategically Edward had the opportunity to set up a ruler in Brittany at least partially under his control, which would provide access to Breton ports, greatly aiding England's naval war and giving ready entry to France for English armies.

== French offensive ==
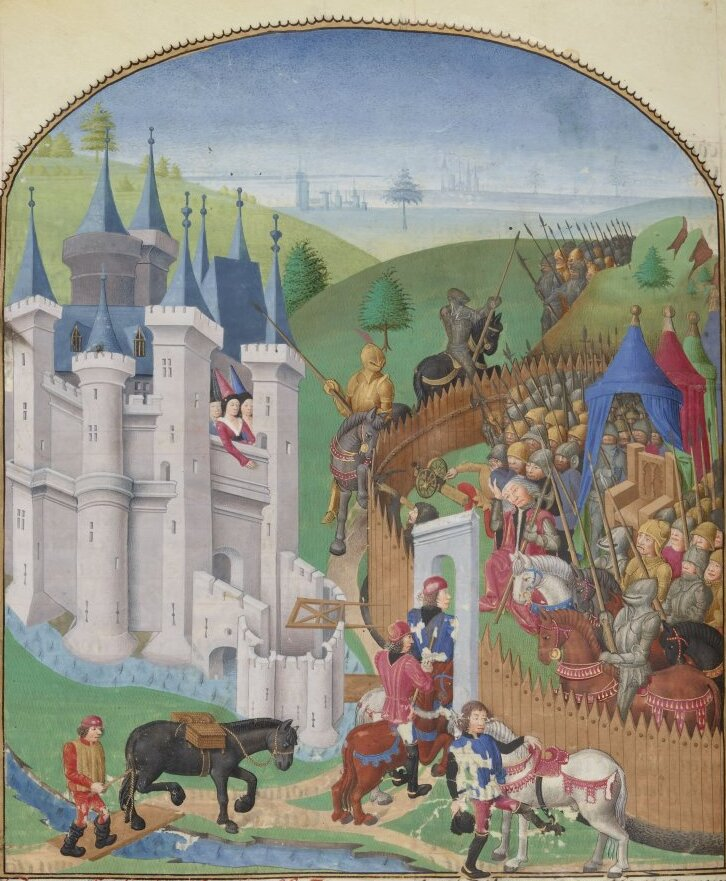
A fifteenth-century impression of Champtoceaux under siege

In late September the French gathered a 7,000-strong army together with a strong force of siege artillery at Angers, 80 kilometres (50 mi) east of the Brittany border, to enforce Charles's claim. This was commanded by Philip's eldest son, John, Duke of Normandy (future King John II), although Philip, nervous and half-hearted about resorting to armed force, allocated minders to oversee him and issued strict instructions. John of Montfort in turn garrisoned the Breton towns and fortifications he controlled. In early October Charles of Blois led the advance guard of the French army along the Loire valley as far as Champtoceaux and laid siege to it, starting the Breton Civil War. The rest of the army followed a few days later. John was heavily outnumbered but boldly advanced with a small force to a fortified outpost at L'Humeau, 5 kilometres (3 mi) west of Champtoceaux. Unknown to John, L'Humeau had already fallen to the French and Charles of Blois was there. When John arrived he almost captured Charles, who escaped with most of the garrison to a fortified tower and barricaded himself in. After two days of fierce fighting, with many casualties on each side, John was driven off by the much larger French force and the tower relieved. By the end of the month Champtoceaux had capitulated to the French.

John of Montfort retreated to Nantes and within a few days the French army was encamped outside the walls. The French were unable to besiege or even effectively blockade the town. Instead they stormed the outlying castles loyal to John and executed the prisoners taken in sight of the town walls to terrorise the populace. The speed of the French advance cut off John from his main field force, which was concentrated around Saint-Renan in the far west of Brittany waiting for English reinforcements. John repeatedly led sorties against the besiegers, using the small force he had with him and the town militia. These met with little success and suffered heavy casualties. Less than a week after the French arrived, and after one such attack led to the deaths of many of a large force of townsmen who had accompanied John, a town assembly insisted that he open negotiations for a capitulation. John personally surrendered to John of Normandy on 2 November, and Charles of Blois entered Nantes, to be celebrated as the rightful duke.

When news of the fall of Nantes arrived Joanna of Flanders was in Rennes with her children, the duchy's treasury and a strong garrison. Modern historians consider her to have been an energetic and effective leader, and she acted decisively and aggressively. She sent the treasury west to Brest, recalled the field army and took command herself. Joining it with some of the troops from Rennes she stormed the town of Redon and then moved on to Hennebont. This was a small but strongly walled town with access to the sea and from there Joanna took control of what forces were still lending their allegiance to her husband's cause, setting up her two-year-old son, also named John, as the faction's figurehead and heir to his father's claim to the duchy. She despatched her senior counsellor, Amaury of Clisson, to Edward III to encourage English intervention and waited on events.

When John surrendered he agreed to give up all of his Breton possessions and abide by King Philip's ruling regarding the inheritance of the Duchy of Brittany, and had been promised a safe conduct to Paris and back. He travelled to Paris at the end of 1341, escorted by John of Normandy. Philip proposed to John that he repudiate all claim to Brittany and his possessions there in favour of Charles of Blois, receiving an annuity and land in France in exchange. John declined, at which Philip withdrew his son's promised safe conduct and had him imprisoned. As this was happening, the military commanders of many of the towns and castles held for John were negotiating handovers to Charles of Blois in exchange for pardons. In eastern Brittany only Rennes held out for the Montfort cause by the end of February 1342. The west remained mostly under Joanna's control.

== Aftermath ==
A small English force reinforced Joanna in May 1342, which was sufficient to keep the Montfort cause alive. Edward III landed in Brest with a larger force in late October, only to agree a truce the following January. John of Montfort died in 1345, but the Breton Civil War continued as a disjointed and inconclusive series of sieges, skirmishes and truces, frequently as part of the Hundred Years' War, until Charles of Blois was killed in 1364 at the Battle of Auray and his army decisively defeated. The next year Joan of Penthièvre, Charles' widow, signed the Treaty of Guérande, recognising John's son as Duke of Brittany, which ended the war.

== Notes, citations and sources ==
=== Sources ===
- Allmand, Christopher (2001). The Hundred Years' War: England and France at War, c. 1300–c. 1450. Cambridge: Cambridge University Press. ISBN 978-0-521-31923-2.
- Burne, Alfred (1999). The Crecy War. Ware, Hertfordshire: Wordsworth Editions. ISBN 978-1-84022-210-4.
- Curry, Anne (2002). The Hundred Years' War 1337–1453. Essential Histories. Oxford: Osprey Publishing. ISBN 978-1-84176-269-2.
- DeVries, Kelly (1998) [1996]. Infantry Warfare in the Early Fourteenth Century. Woodbridge, Suffolk: Boydell Press. ISBN 978-0-85115-567-8.
- Graham-Goering, Erika (2020). Princely Power in Late Medieval France: Jeanne de Penthièvre and the War for Brittany. Cambridge: Cambridge University Press. ISBN 978-1-108-80554-4.
- Jones, Michael (1988). The Creation of Brittany: A Late Medieval State. London: Hambledon Press. ISBN 978-0-907628-80-4.
- Jones, Michael (1999). "War and Fourteenth-Century France". In Curry, Anne; Hughes, Michael (eds.). Arms, Armies and Fortifications in the Hundred Years War. Woodbridge, Suffolk: Boydell & Brewer. pp. 103–120. ISBN 978-0-85115-755-9.
- Mortimer, Ian (2007). The Perfect King: The Life of Edward III, Father of the English Nation. London: Pimlico. ISBN 978-1-84413-530-1.
- Ormrod, W. Mark (1980). The Three Edwards: War and State in England 1272–1377. New Haven: Book Club. ISBN 978-0-297-77730-4. OCLC 1302632810.
- Ormrod, W. Mark (1990). Edward III. New Haven: Yale University Press. ISBN 978-0-300-11910-7. OCLC 1039705847.
- Rogers, Clifford (2004). "The Bergerac Campaign (1345) and the Generalship of Henry of Lancaster". Journal of Medieval Military History. II. Woodbridge, Suffolk: Boydell Press: 89–110. ISBN 978-1-84383-040-5. ISSN 1477-545X.
- Sumption, Jonathan (1990). Trial by Battle. The Hundred Years' War. Vol. I. London: Faber and Faber. ISBN 978-0-571-20095-5.
- Visser, Nils; Snijder, Willeke (2014). "The Flame of Britanny: Jeanne de Flandres". Medieval Warfare. 4 (2): 33–38. JSTOR 48578335.
- Wagner, John A. (2006a). "Breton Civil War (1341–1365)". Encyclopedia of the Hundred Years War. Woodbridge, Suffolk: Greenwood. pp. 59–61. ISBN 978-0-313-32736-0.
- Wagner, John A. (2006b). "Brittany". Encyclopedia of the Hundred Years War. Woodbridge, Suffolk: Greenwood. pp. 62–63. ISBN 978-0-313-32736-0.
- Wagner, John A. (2006c). "Espléchin, Truce of (1340)". Encyclopedia of the Hundred Years War. Woodbridge, Suffolk: Greenwood. pp. 122–123. ISBN 978-0-313-32736-0.
