= Siege of Brest (1342) =

Breton Civil War siege

Coordinates: 48.39°N 4.49°W

- Part of the Breton Civil War
Date	Relieved 18 August 1342
Location	Brest, Brittany
Result	English and Montfortist victory

Belligerents
France; House of Blois	England; House of Montfort

Commanders and leaders
Charles of Blois; Carlo Grimaldi	William of Northampton; Joanna of Flanders

Strength
A large army; 14 galleys; Some smaller boats	Garrison of Brest; 1,350 reinforcements; 140 transports; 120 warships

Casualties and losses
11 galleys; Several smaller craft	Unknown, few if any

The siege of Brest took place in 1342 during the Breton Civil War. When John III, the duke of Brittany, died childless in 1341 the title was contested by Charles of Blois and John of Montfort. Charles was the nephew of the French king, Philip VI (r. 1328–1350), who supported him with a large army. Charles invaded Brittany, making good progress and taking John prisoner. John's wife, Joanna of Flanders, took up the Montfortist cause and fought on. As France and England had been fighting the Hundred Years' War since 1337 Joanna appealed to Edward III, the English king, for military assistance, which was promised.

The assistance was slow in coming and the Montfortist forces were pushed back across Brittany. By July 1342 Joanna was besieged in Brest, the last Breton fortification held for the Montfort cause, by Charles and a large army. The town was blockaded from the sea by 14 mercenary Genoese galleys. On 18 August an English fleet of 260 ships, commanded by William of Northampton, sailed into the Brest Roads and overwhelmed the galleys, burning 11. The English ships carried only 1,350 fighting men, a force far smaller than that of the French army. But seeing so many English ships crowded into the Brest Roads and the English vanguard disembarking onto the beach, the French anticipated an attack by a vast host. Charles promptly broke off the siege and withdrew, abandoning western Brittany. The historian Jonathan Sumption describes this reaction as extraordinary. The English were reinforced over the next two months and held Brest until 1362. The Breton Civil War continued until 1365, the Hundred Years' War until 1453.

== Background ==
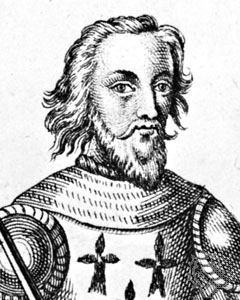
Charles of Blois, the French-backed claimant to the duchy, as envisaged in 1621

Brittany was a province of France, and although the dukes of Brittany were vassals of the French kings, they governed the duchy as independent rulers. Nevertheless, when the Hundred Years' War broke out in 1337 between France and England the Duke of Brittany, John III, fought alongside his feudal lord the king of France, Philip VI. John III died on 30 April 1341, leaving no children and a disputed succession; both his niece, Joan of Penthièvre, and his younger half-brother, John of Montfort, a senior Breton nobleman, claimed the dukedom. If Joan's claim was upheld her husband, Charles of Blois, a well-connected and militarily oriented French nobleman who was also a nephew of the king of France would succeed John III as duke. (Note: The practice by which men hold titles by virtue of marriage is known as jus uxoris.) On John III's death John of Montfort acted quickly and installed friendly garrisons in most of the towns and castles of Brittany by August. Philip initially disregarded the situation until correctly suspecting that John was negotiating with the English, he had Charles declared the rightful heir on 7 September. Philip found the idea of having a relative as the duke attractive: it would bring the traditionally semi-autonomous province more firmly under royal control. He was willing to commit considerable military resources to achieve this and sent an army to support Charles.

The French army overran all of eastern Brittany except Rennes and took John prisoner. (Note: John surrendered on the granting of a safe conduct to Paris and back by John, Duke of Normandy, King Philip's eldest son, who escorted him. He was released in 1343 on condition he gave up the struggle. He stayed away from Brittany until his death in 1345.) John's wife, Joanna of Flanders, was in Rennes when news of John's capture arrived. She acted decisively, recalled the field army from western Brittany, took command and moved to Hennebont – a small but strongly walled town with access to the sea. From there Joanna retained control of most of western Brittany and set up her two-year-old son, also named John, as the faction's figurehead and heir to his father's claim to the duchy. She despatched her senior counsellor, Amaury of Clisson, to Edward III of England with the ducal treasury to encourage English military intervention and waited on events.

On 21 February 1342 Edward sealed a treaty to support the Montfort cause, as an extension of the war with France. Edward saw the opportunity to set up a ruler in Brittany at least partly under his control; this could provide access to Breton ports which would greatly aid England's naval war and give ready entry to France for English armies. English reinforcements took a long time to arrive and the flow of events went against the Montfortists in the face of Charles's huge military superiority. In May 1342 Rennes fell and Hennebont was besieged as Charles pushed his area of control westward. A force of French and mercenary galleys cruised off the north Breton coast, but there was so little English naval activity that they were beached and their crews went ashore to fight as infantry. A small English force, 234 men, arrived under Sir Walter Mauny in May. Edward planned to land in Brittany himself in June with a substantial force, but extreme difficulty gathering sufficient shipping (Note: By English common law, the crown was required to compensate the owners of ships impressed into service, but in practice the king paid little and late, which caused shipowners to be reluctant to answer summonses to arms.) – despite draconian measures taken by Admiral of the North Robert Morley – and then contrary winds, caused this date to be repeatedly put back. (Note: A limitation of cogs was that they lacked points to mount additional masts: at least some fore-and-aft sails are desirable for maneuverability, but clinker-built cogs were effectively limited to a single sail. This caused them to be unhandy, limiting their ability to tack – change direction – while in harbour and making them very reliant on wind direction at the start of voyages; delays due to contrary winds – those blowing from a direction which did not permit egress from harbour – were common and often prolonged.)

== Siege ==
The location of Brest within modern Brittany

=== French siege ===
Charles was strongly reinforced in July and his advance continued. By July Joanna was besieged in the western port of Brest, the only remaining fortified place held by the Montfortists, by Charles of Blois and a large army. Brest was little more than a village, militarily significant only for its castle and its advantageous position on the north shore of the large, sheltered expanse of the Brest Roads (the Iroise Sea) close by its narrow exit to the sea (the Goulet de Brest). (Note: An English fleet under Morley had attacked the port in 1340 and captured a fortune in merchant shipping.) The historian Michael Jones describes the castle as a key ducal stronghold.

In late July ships carrying an English force of 110 men put into a port in western Brittany while sailing to English-held Gascony. Their leader, Hugh Despenser, was so concerned that the Montfortist cause was on the verge of collapse that he stayed in Brittany with either part or all of his force and reinforced the garrison of Brest. The reinforcements Charles received in July gave him the opportunity to put his galleys back to use. He sent 14 foreign galleys commanded by Carlo Grimaldi and John D'Aurea to blockade Brest from the sea. These anchored close to the castle, near the mouth of the small River Penfeld, between Brest and its only access to the sea. Charles was aware that part of the English fleet was on the verge of sailing and so sent 21 French vessels – galleys and other oared vessels – to trap them in Portsmouth.

=== Opposing navies ===
Galleys had long been used by the Mediterranean powers and the French adopted them for use in the English Channel. These galleys were warships and had little transport space for men or equipment: a large galley might carry 150 men, of whom only 25 would be able to fight at sea. Being shallow-draught vessels propelled by banks of oars they could penetrate shallow harbours and were highly manoeuvrable, making them effective for raiding and ship-to-ship combat in meeting engagements. The French galleys were supplemented by galleys hired from Genoa and Monaco. Operating the galleys was a specialist activity and called for highly trained crews.

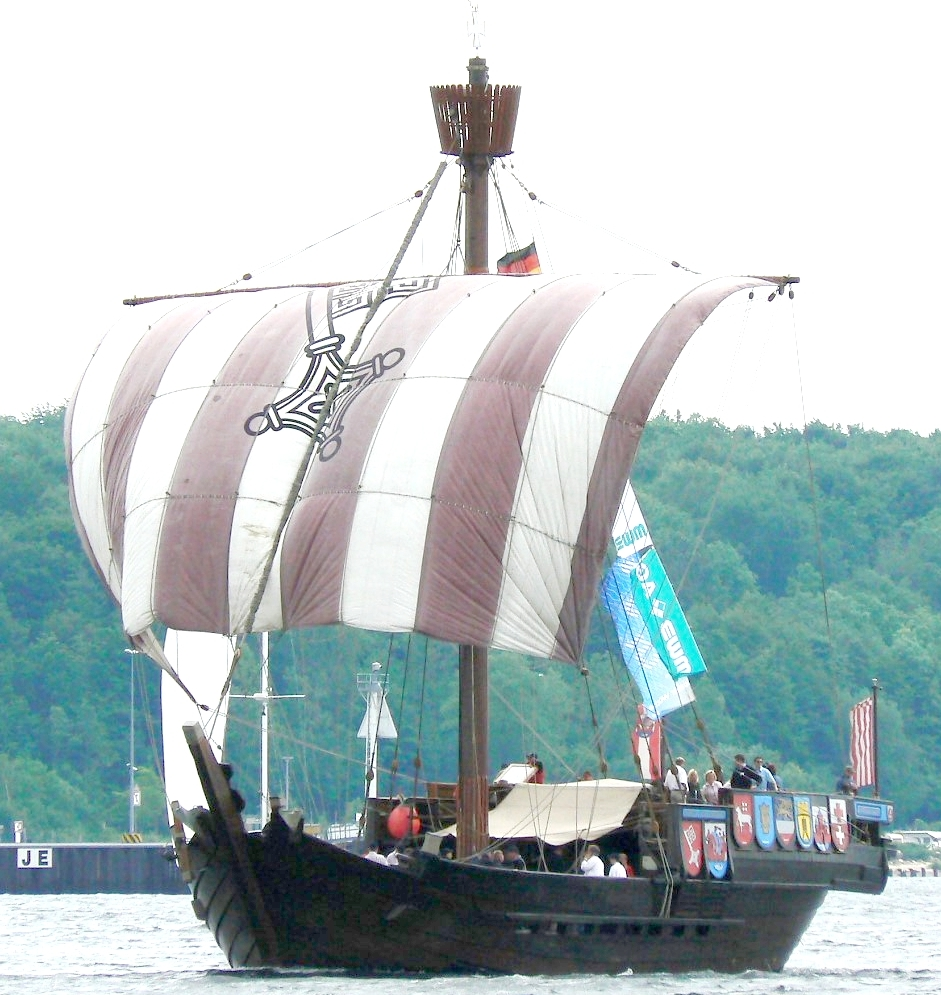
In 1962 a well-preserved wreck of a cog dated to 1380 was found near Bremen, Germany. This is a full-size reproduction. Merchant vessels such as these formed the bulk of the English fleet.

The English did not have a purpose-built navy; Edward owned only three warships. The King relied on requisitioning the merchant vessels of English traders: these were largely vessels known as cogs. Cogs had a deep draught, a round hull and were propelled by a single large sail set on a mast amidships. They could be converted into warships by the addition of wooden forecastles and aftercastles at the bow and stern and the erection of crow's nest platforms at the masthead. Cogs were able to carry many fighting men. Their high freeboard made them superior to the oared vessels in close combat, and arrows or bolts could be fired into or stones dropped onto enemy craft alongside. However, they were slow-moving in comparison to galleys and more difficult to manoeuvre.

=== English relief ===
William of Northampton was supposed to sail from Portsmouth on 8 July in command of the first contingent of the English army, 1,350 men. But on that date not a single requisitioned ship was present. Morley applied a heavy-handed policy of threats and confiscations which was successful; by mid-August 140 transports were assembled, with 120 warships to escort them. The warships were largely converted cogs but included an unknown number of galleys from Bayonne, an English-controlled town in south-west France which owed fealty to Edward. (Note: While the number of Bayonnais galleys under Northampton is not known, the previous year orders were sent to Bayonne to despatch 10 galleys to join the Channel fleet. The orders were countermanded before the ships sailed.) This fleet sailed for Brest on 14 and 15 August. The French squadron despatched by Charles arrived off the Solent a little later, losing their chance of trapping the English fleet. Instead they razed Portsmouth (Note: For the second time in five years.) and devastated the area around Southampton.

France in 1328: English-controlled Gascony is shown in blue in the south west, Brittany is the large province in the north west coloured khaki.

The English fleet took just three days to reach western Brittany, where Brest was on the brink of surrender. The English sailed through the Goulet, taking the Genoese galleys by surprise. The galleys were so close to the entrance of the Goulet that by the time they had prepared for battle the slow-moving and unhandy English ships were almost on top of them. This meant that Grimaldi's squadron had lost its main combat advantage: the speed and manoeuvrability to execute hit-and-run tactics. His captains realised this, and with their only passage to the open sea filled with yet more English ships, they fled. Three of the Genoese ships reached the safety of the Élorn river and fled upstream. The other 11 and a collection of smaller support craft made for the Penfeld. The water at its mouth was too shallow even for galleys and they all grounded. Their crews hastily abandoned them and waded ashore. When the English came up to the beached galleys they set fire to them and those of the other small ships and barges which had also grounded.

The English transport ships carried only 1,350 soldiers, who started to disembark onto the beach. This force was far smaller than that of the French besieging Brest but, seeing so many English ships crowded into the Brest Roads and the English vanguard forming up on the beach, they miscalculated how few troops 260 ships could carry and anticipated an attack by a vast host. Charles promptly broke off the siege and withdrew, abandoning western Brittany. The historian Jonathan Sumption describes this French reaction as extraordinary. The French army retreated 120 kilometres (75 mi) along the north coast of Brittany to Guingamp.

== Aftermath ==
Northampton was reinforced and marched on Morlaix, a town on the north coast with strong fortifications and a secure harbour 50 kilometres (30 mi) from Brest, and besieged it. Charles was now aware that his force greatly outnumbered the English and he attempted to relieve Morlaix but was defeated on 30 September at the battle of Morlaix. (Note: Morlaix was the first major land battle of both the Breton Civil War and the Hundred Years' War) Edward III landed in Brest with a large force on 26 October, only to agree the Truce of Malestroit on 19 January 1343. Hostilities did not recommence until June 1345. Northampton's successes at Brest and Morlaix restarted the Breton Civil War when it was thought nearly over.

Brest remained in English hands for 30 years; as the Hundred Years' War continued it was used to support forces guarding the passage of English ships to and from Gascony and to facilitate descents on the French-held south coast of Brittany. The Breton Civil War continued as a disjointed and inconclusive series of sieges, skirmishes and truces, frequently as part of the Hundred Years' War. The eastern and southern parts of Brittany were mostly held by the French, who continued to strongly support Charles of Blois, while western and northern Brittany continued to be largely Montfort- or English-controlled. Charles of Blois was killed in 1364 at the battle of Auray and his army decisively defeated. The next year his widow, Joan of Penthièvre, signed the Treaty of Guérande, recognising John of Montfort's son as Duke of Brittany, which ended the civil war. The Hundred Years' War lasted until 1453.

== Notes, citations and sources ==
=== Sources ===
- Allmand, Christopher (2001). The Hundred Years' War: England and France at War, c. 1300–c. 1450. Cambridge: Cambridge University Press. ISBN 978-0-521-31923-2.
- Ayton, Andrew (1999). Knights and Warhorses: Military Service and the English Aristocracy under Edward III. Boydel Press: Woodbridge, Suffolk. ISBN 978-0-85115-739-9.
- Burne, Alfred (1999). The Crecy War. Ware, Hertfordshire: Wordsworth Editions. ISBN 978-1-84022-210-4.
- Cushway, Graham (2011). Edward III and the War at Sea. Woodbridge, Suffolk: Boydell Press. ISBN 978-1-84383-621-6.
- Curry, Anne (2002). The Hundred Years' War 1337–1453. Essential Histories. Oxford: Osprey Publishing. ISBN 978-1-84176-269-2.
- Friel, Ian (1994). "Winds of Change? Ships and the Hundred Years War". In Curry, Anne (ed.). Arms, Armies, and Fortifications in the Hundred Years War. Woodbridge, Suffolk: Boydell Press. pp. 183–194. ISBN 0-85115-365-8.
- Graham-Goering, Erika (2020). Princely Power in Late Medieval France: Jeanne de Penthièvre and the War for Brittany. Cambridge: Cambridge University Press. ISBN 978-1-108-80554-4.
- Jones, Michael (1988). The Creation of Brittany: A Late Medieval State. London: Hambledon Press. ISBN 978-0-907628-80-4.
- Jones, Michael (1999). "War and Fourteenth-Century France". In Curry, Anne & Hughes, Michael (eds.). Arms, Armies and Fortifications in the Hundred Years War. Woodbridge, Suffolk: Boydell & Brewer. pp. 103–120. ISBN 978-0-85115-755-9.
- Mortimer, Ian (2007). The Perfect King: The Life of Edward III, Father of the English Nation. London: Pimlico. ISBN 978-1-84413-530-1.
- Neillands, Robin (2001). The Hundred Years War. London; New York: Routledge. ISBN 978-0-415-26131-9.
- Ormrod, W. Mark (1980). The Three Edwards: War and State in England 1272–1377. New Haven: Book Club. ISBN 978-0-297-77730-4. OCLC 1302632810.
- Ormrod, W. Mark (1990). Edward III. New Haven: Yale University Press. ISBN 978-0-300-11910-7. OCLC 1039705847.
- Piera, Montserrat (2019). Women Readers and Writers in Medieval Iberia: Spinning the Text. Leiden: Brill. ISBN 978-90-04-40649-0.
- Rodger, N.A.M. (2004). The Safeguard of the Sea: A Naval History of Britain. 660–1649. Vol. I. London: Penguin. ISBN 978-0-14-029724-9.
- Rogers, Clifford (2004). "The Bergerac Campaign (1345) and the Generalship of Henry of Lancaster". Journal of Medieval Military History. Vol. II. Woodbridge, Suffolk: Boydell Press. pp. 89–110. ISBN 978-1-84383-040-5. ISSN 1477-545X.
- Rose, Susan (1998) [1994]. "Edward III: Sluys, 1340". In Grove, E. (ed.). Great Battles of the Royal Navy: As Commemorated in the Gunroom, Britannia Royal Naval College, Dartmouth. London: Arms and Armour Press. pp. 24–30. ISBN 978-1-85409-417-9.
- Rose, Susan (2007). The Medieval Sea. London: Bloomsbury. ISBN 978-1-85285-563-5.
- Runyan, Timothy J. (2003). "Naval Power and Maritime Technology During the Hundred Years' War". In Hattendorf, John B. & Unger, Richard W. (eds.). War at Sea in the Middle Ages and Renaissance. Woodbridge, Suffolk: Boydell Press. pp. 53–68. ISBN 978-0-85115-903-4.
- Sumption, Jonathan (1990). Trial by Battle. The Hundred Years' War. Vol. I. London: Faber and Faber. ISBN 978-0-571-20095-5.
- Visser, Nils; Snijder, Willeke (2014). "The Flame of Britanny: Jeanne de Flandres". Medieval Warfare. 4 (2): 33–38. JSTOR 48578335.
- Wagner, John A. (2006). Encyclopedia of the Hundred Years War. Woodbridge, Suffolk: Greenwood. ISBN 978-0-313-32736-0.
- Williamson, James Alexander (1944) [1931]. The Evolution of England: A Commentary on the Facts. Oxford: Clarendon Press. OCLC 984703073.
