= Edward III's Breton campaign =

1342–43 Hundred Years' War campaign

Edward III's Breton campaign, 1342–1343
- Part of the Breton Civil War and the Hundred Years' War
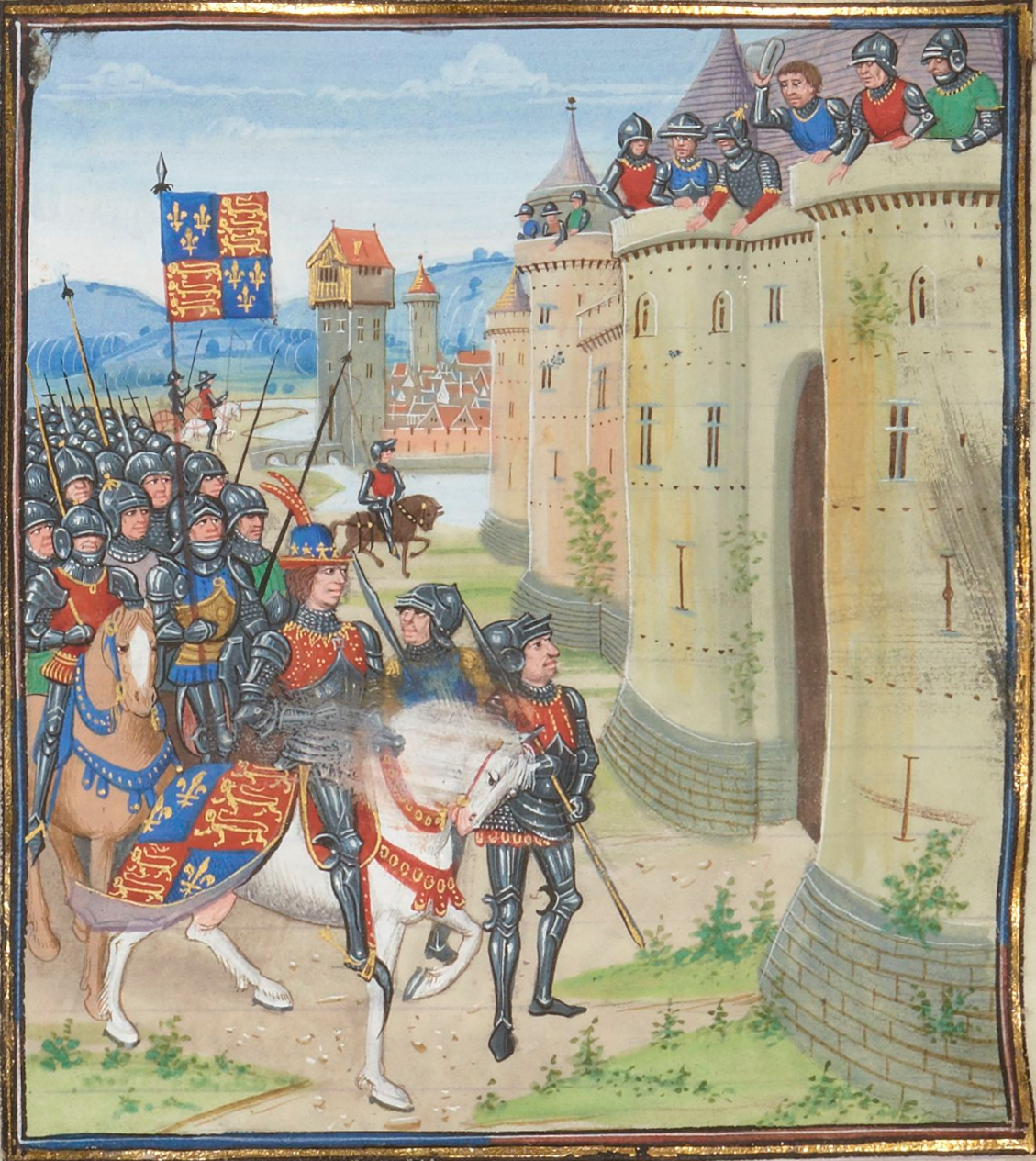
- Edward III outside a walled town depicted in the Froissart of Louis of Gruuthuse
Date	26 October 1342 – 19 January 1343
Location	Brittany
Result	Inconclusive (Truce of Malestroit)

Belligerents
France; House of Blois	England; House of Montfort

Commanders and leaders
Charles of Blois; John, Duke of Normandy	Edward III

Strength
Unknown but large	English: fewer than 5,500; Bretons: unknown

King Edward III of England led a campaign in the Duchy of Brittany in 1342 and 1343. England, at war with France since 1337 in the Hundred Years' War, had sided with John of Montfort's faction in the War of the Breton Succession soon after it broke out in 1341. The French king, Philip VI, supported the rival claimant, Charles of Blois, who was his nephew. By August 1342, Charles had captured John and reduced his partisans back to just one fortification, Brest in western Brittany. An English fleet broke the blockade of Brest on 18 August. On 30 September, a numerically inferior English army inflicted a heavy defeat on the French at the battle of Morlaix.

Edward was supposed to arrive with the next contingent of his army shortly after the first, but had severe difficulties gathering sufficient shipping. On 6 October, he abandoned his siege train and set sail with those troops he could embark on the available ships. They reached Brittany on 26 October after a storm-wracked three-week passage, and Edward advanced on the south-central Breton town of Vannes. The naval component went ahead, but was mauled by a force of mercenary galleys and then failed in an attempt to take Vannes by a coup de main. The land component was delayed in building siege engines before attempting to storm the town on 29 November. The newly reinforced French garrison repelled this assault, and a siege began.

English raiding parties devastated large parts of eastern Brittany, but attempts to reinforce or supply Edward from England failed. A large French army was raised with difficulty and advanced to Malestroit, 18 miles (29 km) from the English camp. Philip moved his court to Brittany and entered into negotiations with Edward. The Truce of Malestroit, which was supposed to pause hostilities for three-and-a-half years, was agreed on 19 January 1343. It is widely seen as favouring the English. Edward returned to England on 1 March.

== Background ==
During the early 14th century, Brittany was a province of France. Still, while the dukes of Brittany were vassals of the French kings, they governed the duchy as independent rulers. Nevertheless, when the Hundred Years' War broke out in 1337 between France and England, the Duke of Brittany, John III, fought alongside his feudal lord: the King of France, Philip VI. John died on 30 April 1341, leaving a disputed succession, with both his niece, Joan of Penthièvre, and his younger half-brother, John of Montfort, claiming the dukedom. Joan transmitted her title to her husband, who was Charles of Blois, a nephew of the king of France. John had the stronger legal claim, but the aristocracy and clergy knew little about him and mostly preferred Charles. John's more limited support came largely from the lower levels of society, especially in the towns.

Correctly suspecting that John was negotiating with the English, Philip had the Parlement of Paris – a judicial rather than legislative body, which had been hearing the case in its usual long, drawn-out manner – declare Charles of Blois the legitimate successor to John III. It complied on 7 September. Philip now found the idea of having a relative as the duke attractive, as it would bring the traditionally semi-autonomous province more firmly under royal control; he therefore dispatched an army to support Charles. This army overran all of eastern Brittany apart from Rennes, and captured John of Montfort. (Note: John surrendered on the granting of a safe conduct to Paris and back by John, Duke of Normandy, the oldest son of the French king, who escorted him. It was proposed to John that he repudiate all claim to Brittany and his possessions there in favour of Charles of Blois, receiving an annuity and land in France in exchange. John declined, at which Philip withdrew his son's promised safe conduct and had him imprisoned.) John's wife, Joanna of Flanders, was in Rennes with their two-year-old son (also named John) and the ducal treasury when news of John's capture arrived. She recalled the Montfortist field army, took command, and moved to Hennebont. From there, Joanna retained control of most of western Brittany, setting up her son as the faction's figurehead and heir to his father's claim to the duchy. She dispatched her senior counsellor, Amaury of Clisson, to Edward III of England with a large sum of cash to encourage rapid English military intervention.

== English intervention ==
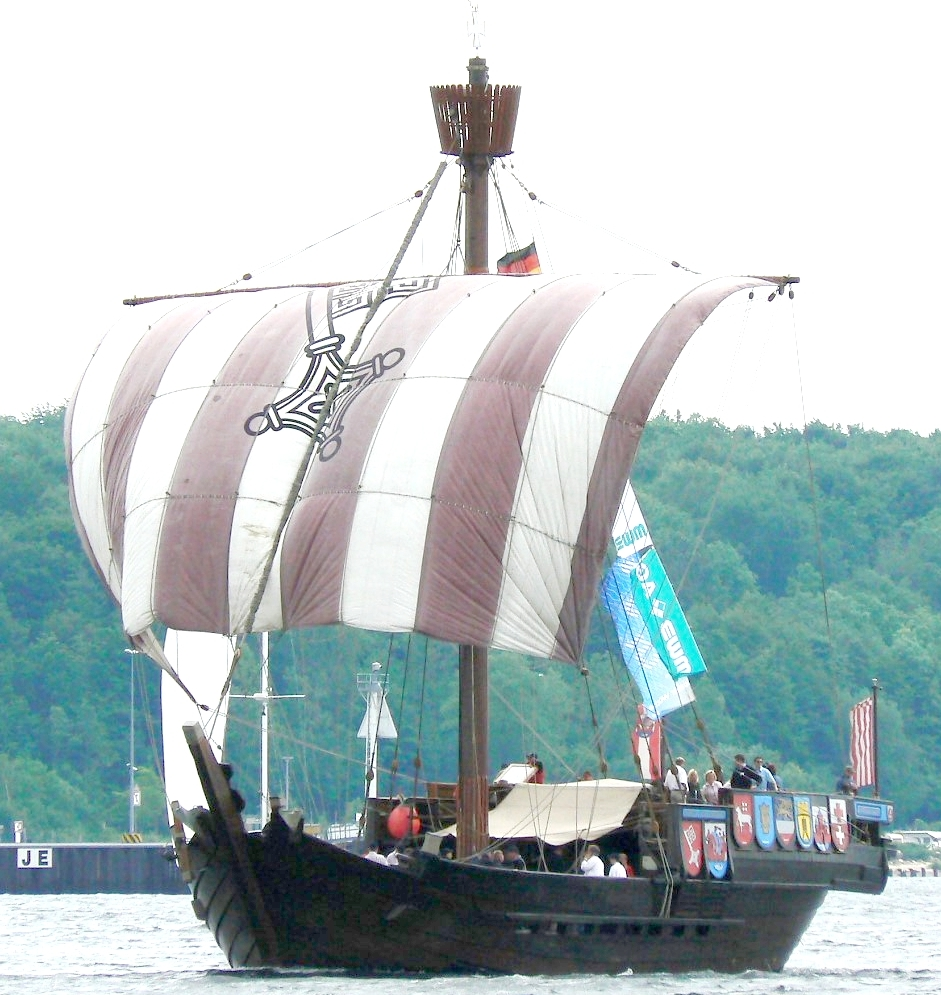
In 1962 a well-preserved wreck of a cog dated to 1380 was found near Bremen, Germany. This is a full-size reproduction. Merchant vessels such as these formed the bulk of the English fleet.

By the end of 1341, the Montfortist cause was being supported by Edward III as an extension of the war with France. This was the start of Edward's provincial strategy, by which he sided with French vassals of Philip in their disagreements with him: this promoted Edward's claim to be the rightful king of France and potentially created military allies. Strategically, Edward had the opportunity to set up a ruler in Brittany at least partially under his control, which would provide access to Breton ports, greatly aiding England's naval war and giving ready entry to France for English armies. However, English reinforcements took a long time to reach Brittany.

A force of 234 men arrived under Sir Walter Mauny, a member of Edward's household, in May 1342 and relieved Hennebont, where a French army was besieging Joanna. Edward planned to land in Brittany himself in June with a substantial force, but had extreme difficulty in assembling ships. (Note: By English common law, the Crown was required to compensate the owners of ships impressed into service, but in practice the king paid little and late, which caused shipowners to be reluctant to answer summonses to arms.) The Admiral of the North Robert Morley applied draconian measures to impress and retain ships; however, they took time to have effect. The Earl of Northampton was supposed to sail from Portsmouth on 8 July 1342 in command of the first contingent of the English army, 1,350 men. Still, on that date, not a single requisitioned ship was present. Morley's heavy-handed policy of threats and confiscations eventually bore fruit, and 440 ships were assembled, split between several ports, with the largest group in the Solent. Even this fleet would have to make several trips if it were to carry the total of 6,000 men Edward wished to deploy to Brittany, and contrary winds caused the departure of the first English echelon to be repeatedly put back.

In May 1342 Clement VI became pope. He was strongly pro-French and had previously been one of Philip's senior advisers. He dispatched two cardinals to attempt a permanent settlement of the Anglo-French war; Philip well received them in June, but Edward would not even allow them to cross the Channel. Instead, he continued to gather ships and troops. Meanwhile, the French strongly reinforced their army in Brittany; Montfortist garrisons surrendered or slipped away to the west in the face of the huge French military superiority. By July, Joanna had been forced back to the far west of Brittany and was besieged in the port of Brest, the only remaining fortified place still held by her faction. Charles of Blois and a large army had invested the town and mercenary galleys, hired from Genoa, blockaded it from the sea.

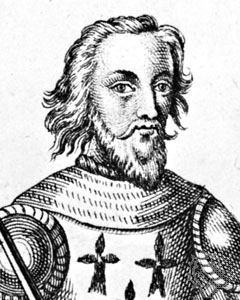
Charles of Blois as envisaged in 1621

By mid-August, there were 140 transports in Portsmouth, with 120 warships to escort them, awaiting a fair wind. Charles was aware that the English fleet was on the verge of sailing and sent twenty-one French vessels – galleys and other oared vessels – to trap those English ships waiting to leave the Solent. The wind shifted, and the English sailed for Brest on 14 and 15 August. The French squadron dispatched by Charles arrived off the Solent a little later, losing their chance of trapping the English fleet. Instead they razed Portsmouth (Note: For the second time in five years.) and devastated the area around Southampton. Brest was on the brink of surrender when the English arrived on 18 August. Their fleet took the Genoese by surprise, defeated them, and burned most of their ships. The 1,350 fighting men carried by the fleet constituted a force far smaller than that of the French besieging Brest. Nevertheless, seeing so many English ships crowded into the area of sheltered water off the port known as the Brest Roads and the English vanguard disembarking onto the beach, they expected an attack by a vast host. Charles promptly broke off the siege, abandoned western Brittany, and withdrew 70 miles (100 km) to Guingamp. There he concentrated his forces and called up local levies.

A few days after landing, the English were reinforced by 800 men under Robert of Artois, a disaffected French nobleman, and absorbed several small English forces (Note: Including the survivors of the 234 men who had arrived with Mauny; of a detachment, or possibly all, of a 110-man force under Hugh Despenser; and perhaps other, smaller, groups.) and an unknown number of John of Montfort's Breton partisans. This force marched 30 miles (50 km) from Brest to Morlaix, a port on the north coast of Brittany with strong fortifications and a secure harbour, and laid siege to it. Morlaix would make a good disembarkation point for the next echelon of English troops under Edward III. Edward's contingent was still in England awaiting the return of the ships which had transported Northampton's echelon. The French mistakenly believed Edward's army would be used in northern France, probably disembarking in Picardy. A French army was gathered to confront this imagined threat, including many men transferred from Brittany. Charles became aware that his force greatly outnumbered the English, despite the detachments to Picardy, and took his army west in an attempt to relieve Morlaix. He was defeated on 30 September at the battle of Morlaix, suffering heavy losses. (Note: Morlaix was the first major land battle of both the Breton Civil War and the Hundred Years' War.)

== Edward's campaign ==
The 260 English ships that had disembarked Northampton's expedition at Brest on 18 August, together with those that had landed Robert of Artois's reinforcements, were supposed to sail back to England immediately. It was envisaged that they would pick up the 3,000 additional men whom Edward had gathered and return to Brittany by early September. The ships' captains, frustrated at having been requisitioned for up to three months and aware there was little left of the sailing season, deserted en route. When the rest arrived at the English ports, there was not enough transport capacity for even half of Edward's force. On 6 October, Edward abandoned his siege train on the beach at Sandwich and set sail with those troops he was able to embark onto the available shipping. They reached Brittany on 26 October after a storm-wracked passage.

=== Move to Vannes ===
A map of Brittany, with 21st-century administrative boundaries, showing the locations of some of the places mentioned in the text

Edward concentrated the English and Montfortist forces at Brest and called a council of war. It was agreed to move to the major town of Vannes and attempt to capture it. Vannes was the second most populous settlement in Brittany, and had a good harbour and strong walls. From Vannes, a strong detachment could control much of southern Brittany. On 7 November, both the navy and the army set off. The fleet was depleted even further from the one that had arrived two weeks earlier; in the interim, another 186 ships had deserted. Their masters and crews were unhappy at not being paid and at being forced out to sea in dangerous winter weather. Those left sailed along the south coast of Brittany under the command of Robert of Artois, probably carrying the 800 men who had sailed with him from England.

Robert was a reckless commander, and he sailed past Vannes into the Bay of Bourgneuf, south west of Nantes. There he attacked a galley squadron overwintering at Beauvoir-sur-Mer. The galley crews were ready and were able to man their vessels before the English reached them. In the ensuing fighting, the English came off much the worse, suffering many casualties and losing several ships. The surviving ships sailed back to Vannes, enduring another winter storm along the way. An attempt to take the town with a surprise attack came close to success but was defeated, with Robert being fatally wounded. The attack's main effect was to alert the French, who reinforced the garrison to 300 men and assigned an experienced commander.

In England, the King's Council attempted to organise a further fleet to carry supplies and reinforcements. Approximately 1,400 men were assembled, but only 56 vessels were mustered. These sailed on or after 3 November carrying 600 men, but were driven ashore in the Isles of Scilly by further storms. They and the 800 men who had not sailed waited in vain for a break in the weather; they were finally stood down in February 1343. Only the earls of Pembroke and Gloucester, with their immediate entourages, are recorded as having reached Brittany. The rest of the council abandoned attempts to cross the Channel in winter and agreed to reassemble with an army of 6,000 – the large majority of which was much-needed infantry – on the unrealistically early date of 1 March.

=== Siege of Vannes ===
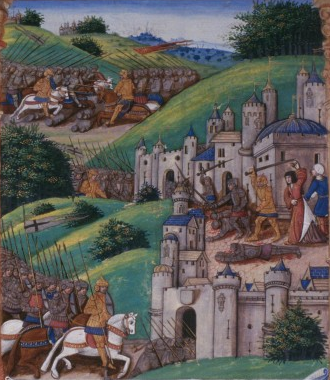
The siege of Vannes

The main English army marched unopposed some 120 miles (190 km) through southern Brittany, halting 12 miles (19 km) from Vannes for a week to make new siege engines – replacements for those the English fleet had been unable to transport. On 29 November, the Anglo-Breton army reached Vannes and attempted to take it by storm. The newly reinforced French garrison repelled this assault, and a siege began. Vannes suffered from a severe and deadly outbreak of illness in 1342, which may have raised hopes that it would fall rapidly. (Note: Too little detail is known to be able to identify the disease.) The siege did not require the entire army, and large detachments were sent on chevauchees across eastern Brittany to devastate the region and capture the fortified places. One expedition, commanded by the Earl of Salisbury, razed the outskirts of Dinan and devastated the area around Dol, 100 miles (160 km) north east of Vannes. Ploërmel, Malestroit and Redon were captured and Nantes, the ducal capital, was besieged.

Increasing numbers of Breton knights and lords switched their allegiance to the Montfortist cause. However, there were fewer than 5,000 English troops in Brittany, and the term of service of many was running out; it is known that 400 Welsh archers left the army on 17 December for this reason. An unknown number of Montfortist partisans supplemented the English; the French believed there were many such men, but their reliability and enthusiasm were uncertain. In particular, the Anglo-Breton force was short of infantry. No food supplies were arriving for Edward by sea, and although he sent out columns over a broad area, foraging in winter yielded thin returns. Edward's army was in difficulty.

=== Truce ===
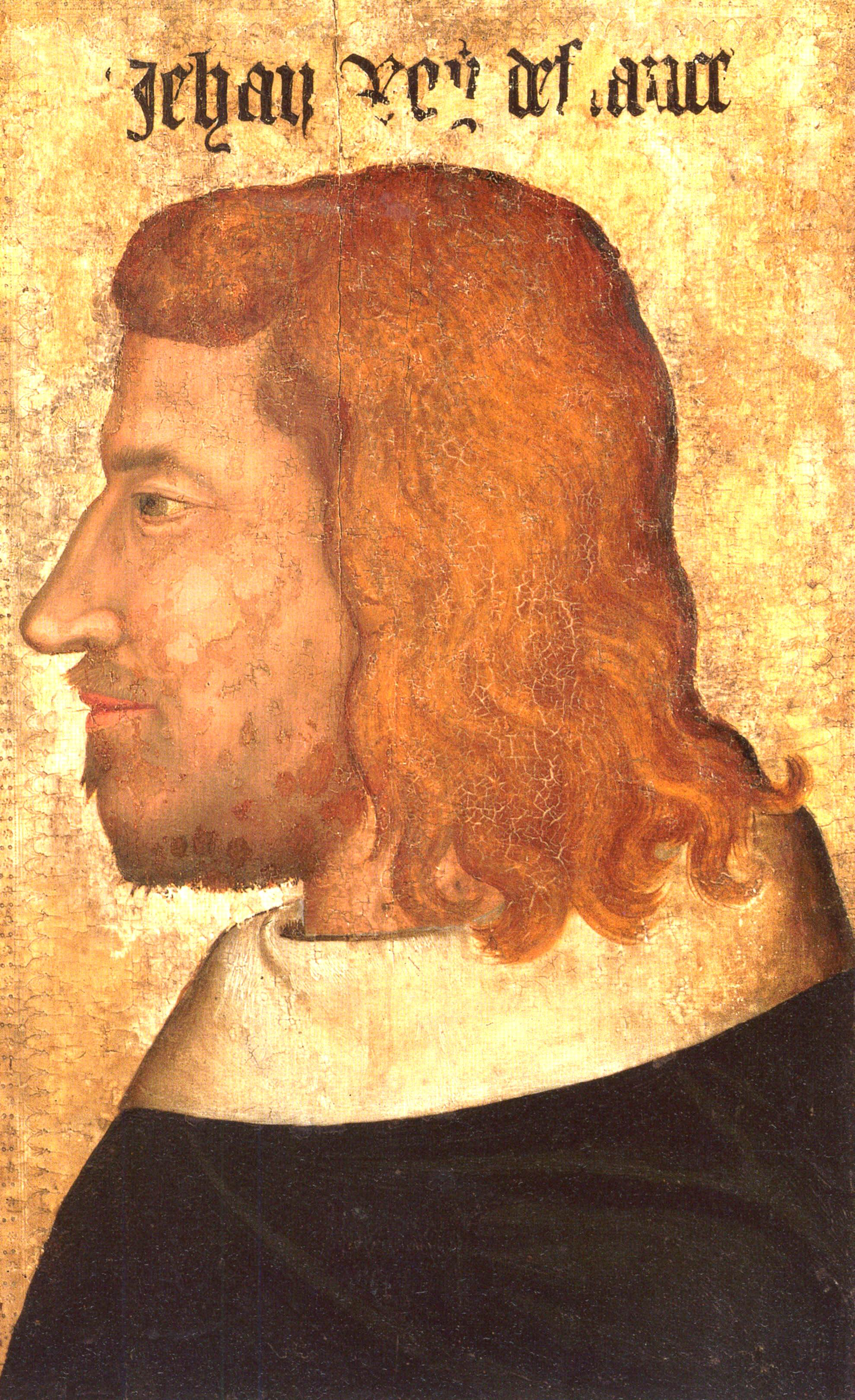
A contemporary image of John, Duke of Normandy (later King of France)

The French were perturbed by Edward's landing in Brittany, when he was expected to invade further east, and by his taking the field so late in the season, when their armies had been disbanded. During November, they struggled to assemble an army and to acquire sufficient supplies to feed and equip it. The army was based at the main French supply centre of Angers with King Philip's oldest son, John, Duke of Normandy, in command. There are no contemporary figures on the size of the French army, but it was several times larger than the Anglo-Breton force. It was 14 December before it commenced the 50 miles (80 km) journey west to the Breton border. Edward was sufficiently alarmed to invite the two cardinals he had brushed off in the summer to present their credentials. They had been observing events from Avranches, just over the Breton border, and were allowed no closer than Malestroit, 18 miles (29 km) from the main English camp. Edward suspected that everything they saw would be passed on to the French, and took great care not to betray the small size and poor state of his army.

Once started, the French advance was rapid; it was Christmas Day (25 December) 1342 when the French relieved Nantes, just in time to foil a plot to open the gates to the English. Redon, Ploërmel, and Malestroit were recaptured during early January, and the French encamped around the latter. The two cardinals were probably in Malestroit when it fell to the French, on or shortly after 10 January. Philip VI set up his court at Redon and also sent emissaries to the cardinals at Malestroit. By 19 January 1343, the terms of a truce had been agreed, and it was sealed. The break in hostilities was to last until 29 September 1346, and the historian Jonathan Sumption describes the terms as "astonishingly favourable" to the English. Both France and England were to retain the territory they held when the truce came into effect: this applied to Brittany, Gascony, Flanders, and Scotland. The English garrisoned the fortified places they held in Brittany. Vannes was to be held by the papacy for the duration of the truce, Philip was to immediately free John of Montfort, and there was a general exchange of prisoners. Both monarchs pledged to negotiate in Avignon, mediated by Clement, a treaty to end the war permanently. In reality each saw the truce as a mere pause and neither intended to negotiate in good faith; the truce had only been agreed because each king felt it was beneficial to him. Edward left for England, enduring another winter storm which scattered the fleet and sank several ships, and arrived on 1 March.

== Aftermath ==
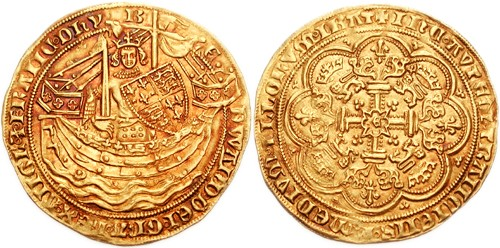
A coin of 1354, the obverse showing Edward sitting in a boat; the historian Ian Mortimer states that this "became one of the most enduring images of fourteenth-century kingship"

Philip believed that with the fighting ended, all the English would leave for home. He was mistaken, and the Breton Civil War ground on as a disjointed and inconclusive series of petty sieges, skirmishes, and truces, with the English and their Montfortist allies holding almost the whole of Brittany by 1345. Late in 1343, Montfortists in Vannes rose against the Pope's authority, expelled his garrison, and delivered the town to the English, who held it until the end of the Breton Civil War in 1364. John of Montfort was not released until September, (Note: He was released on condition he gave up the struggle. He stayed away from Brittany until he died in 1345.) despite the stipulation of the treaty. Brest remained in English hands for 30 years; as the Hundred Years' War continued, it was used to support forces guarding the passage of English ships to and from Gascony and to facilitate descents on the French-held parts of Brittany. The fighting continued much as before in Gascony; by August 1345, the region had reverted to full-scale war with a major Anglo-Gascon offensive.

Both the French and the English sent delegations to a peace conference at Avignon sponsored by Clement. Procedural disagreements delayed its start until October 1344. The proposals made by each side were unacceptable to the other, and the English ended the discussion in November. Edward was planning another major invasion of France long before the truce was due to expire in September 1346. He renounced it in June 1345, and personally led another expedition to France in July 1346, this time landing in Normandy.

== Notes, citations and sources ==
=== Sources ===
- Allmand, Christopher (2001). The Hundred Years' War: England and France at War, c. 1300–c. 1450. Cambridge: Cambridge University Press. ISBN 978-0-521-31923-2.
- Ayton, Andrew (1999). Knights and Warhorses: Military Service and the English Aristocracy under Edward III. Boydel Press: Woodbridge, Suffolk. ISBN 978-0-85115-739-9.
- Bárány, Attila (1997). "The Participation of the English Aristocracy in the First Phase of the Hundred Years War". Hungarian Journal of English and American Studies. 3 (2): 211–240. JSTOR 41273967.
- "Charles, Duke of Brittany". Britannica. Encyclopædia Britannica. 2025.
- Burne, Alfred (1999) [1955]. The Crécy War. Ware, Hertfordshire: Wordsworth Editions. ISBN 978-1-84022-210-4.
- Curry, Anne (2002). The Hundred Years' War 1337–1453. Essential Histories. Oxford: Osprey Publishing. ISBN 978-1-84176-269-2.
- Cushway, Graham (2011). Edward III and the War at Sea: The English Navy, 1327–1377. Woodbridge, Suffolk: Boydell Press. ISBN 978-1-84383-621-6.
- DeVries, Kelly (1998) [1996]. Infantry Warfare in the Early Fourteenth Century. Woodbridge, Suffolk: Boydell Press. ISBN 978-0-85115-567-8.
- Frélaut, Bertrand (2005). Histoire de Vannes (in French). Paris: Gisser. ISBN 978-2-87747-527-3.
- Friel, Ian (2003). "Oars, Sails and Guns: The English and War at Sea, c. 1200–c. 1500". In Hattendorf, John; Unger, Richard (eds.). War at Sea in the Middle Ages and the Renaissance. Woodbridge, Suffolk: Boydell Press. pp. 69–82. ISBN 0-85115-903-6.
- Graham-Goering, Erika (2020). Princely Power in Late Medieval France: Jeanne de Penthièvre and the War for Brittany. Cambridge: Cambridge University Press. ISBN 978-1-108-80554-4.
- Jones, Michael (1988). The Creation of Brittany: A Late Medieval State. London: Hambledon Press. ISBN 978-0-907628-80-4.
- Mortimer, Ian (2007). The Perfect King: The Life of Edward III, Father of the English Nation. London: Pimlico. ISBN 978-1-84413-530-1.
- Ormrod, W. Mark (1990). Edward III. New Haven: Yale University Press. ISBN 978-0-300-11910-7. OCLC 1039705847.
- Prestwich, Michael (1980). The Three Edwards: War and State in England 1272–1377. London: Book Club Associates. ISBN 9780297777304.
- Rodger, N. A. M. (2004). The Safeguard of the Sea: A Naval History of Britain. 660–1649. Vol. I. London: Penguin. ISBN 978-0-14-029724-9.
- Rose, Susan (2007). The Medieval Sea. London: Bloomsbury. ISBN 978-1-85285-563-5.
- Sadler, John (2013) [2005]. Border Fury: England and Scotland at War 1296–1568. London; New York: Routledge. ISBN 978-1-4058-4022-4.
- Sumption, Jonathan (1990). The Hundred Years War 1: Trial by Battle. London: Faber & Faber. ISBN 978-0-571-13895-1.
- Visser, Nils & Snijder, Willeke (2014). "The Flame of Britanny: Jeanne de Flandres". Medieval Warfare. 4 (2): 33–38. JSTOR 48578335.
- Wagner, John A. (2006). Encyclopedia of the Hundred Years War. Woodbridge, Suffolk: Greenwood. ISBN 978-0-313-32736-0.
- Williamson, James Alexander (1944) [1931]. The Evolution of England: A Commentary on the Facts. Oxford: Clarendon Press. OCLC 984703073.
