= Battle of Morlaix =

Battle during the Hundred Years' War

Coordinates: 48°38′N 3°44′W

- Part of the Breton Civil War
Date	30 September 1342
Location	Lanmeur, Brittany, France
Result	English victory

Belligerents
Kingdom of England; House of Montfort	Kingdom of France; House of Blois

Commanders and leaders
William, Earl of Northampton	Charles of Blois; Geoffrey of Charny

Strength
3,000–5,000	10,000–15,000

Casualties and losses
Light	Heavy
- Location of the battle within modern France

The battle of Morlaix was fought near the village of Lanmeur in Brittany, France, on 30 September 1342 between an Anglo-Breton army and a much larger Franco-Breton force. England, at war with France since 1337 in the Hundred Years' War, had sided with John of Montfort's faction in the Breton Civil War shortly after it broke out in 1341. The French were supporting Duke Charles of Blois, a nephew of the French king.

A small Anglo-Breton army under William, Earl of Northampton, besieged the Breton port of Morlaix. Charles led a force several times larger than Northampton's from the town of Guingamp to relieve Morlaix. Warned of this, the English carried out a night march and prepared a defensive position just outside Lanmeur. When they sighted the English position, the French deployed into three divisions, one behind the other. The first of these, probably made up of Breton levies, advanced and was shot to pieces by the English archers using longbows, halting their advance; the attackers then broke without making contact. The second division, of French and Breton men-at-arms, attacked but their charge was halted when they fell into a camouflaged ditch in front of the English position. Presented with a large, close-range target the English archers inflicted many casualties. About 200 French cavalry made their way over the ditch and came to grips with the English men-at-arms, who were fighting on foot. This band was cut off by the English and all were killed or captured.

Northampton was concerned that the English archers were running low on arrows and that the ditch was so full of dead and wounded men and horses as to be ineffective as an obstacle. Therefore, when the third French division was seen to be preparing to attack the English withdrew into a wood to their rear. The French were unable to force their way in, so they surrounded it and besieged the English, possibly for several days. Northampton broke out with a night attack and returned to Morlaix. Charles gave up his attempt to relieve the town and retreated. This was the first major land battle of the Hundred Years' War and the tactics used foreshadowed those of both the French and the English for the rest of the 1340s.

== Background ==
Brittany was a province of France, but though the dukes of Brittany were vassals of the French kings they governed the duchy as independent rulers. Nevertheless, when the Hundred Years' War broke out in 1337 between France and England the Duke of Brittany, John III (r. 1312–1341), fought alongside his feudal lord the King of France, Philip VI (r. 1328–1350). John died on 30 April 1341, leaving a disputed succession: both his niece, Joan of Penthièvre, and his younger half-brother, John of Montfort, claimed the dukedom; Joan was married to Charles of Blois, a well-connected and militarily oriented French nobleman who was also a nephew of the King of France. John had the stronger legal claim, but the aristocracy and clergy knew little about him and mostly preferred Charles' claim. What support John had came largely from the lower levels of society, especially in the towns.

Starting in early June 1341 John seized almost all of the fortified places in Brittany and by mid-August had all but made good his claim to the duchy. Philip initially disregarded the situation, ignoring requests for assistance from Charles of Blois. Correctly suspecting that John was negotiating with the English, the French declared Charles the rightful heir on 7 September. Philip found the idea of having a relative as the duke attractive as it would bring the traditionally semi-autonomous province more firmly under royal control. He was willing to commit considerable military resources to achieve this and despatched an army to support Charles.

This army overran all of eastern Brittany, apart from Rennes, in the six months from September 1341 and captured John. (Note: John surrendered on the granting of a safe conduct to Paris and back by John, Duke of Normandy, King Philip's oldest son, who escorted him. He was released in 1343 on condition that he gave up the struggle. He stayed away from Brittany until his death in 1345.) John's wife, Joanna of Flanders, was in Rennes with her two-year-old son, also named John, and the ducal treasury when news of John's capture arrived. Modern historians consider her to have been an energetic and effective leader, and she acted decisively and aggressively. She recalled the field army from western Brittany, took command and moved to Hennebont. This was a small but strongly walled town with access to the sea and from there Joanna retained control of most of western Brittany, setting up her son as the faction's figurehead and heir to his father's claim to the duchy. She despatched her senior counsellor, Amaury of Clisson, to Edward III in England with a large sum in cash to encourage English military intervention and waited on events. By the end of 1341 the Montfortist cause was being supported by Edward III as an extension of the war with France.

== English intervention ==
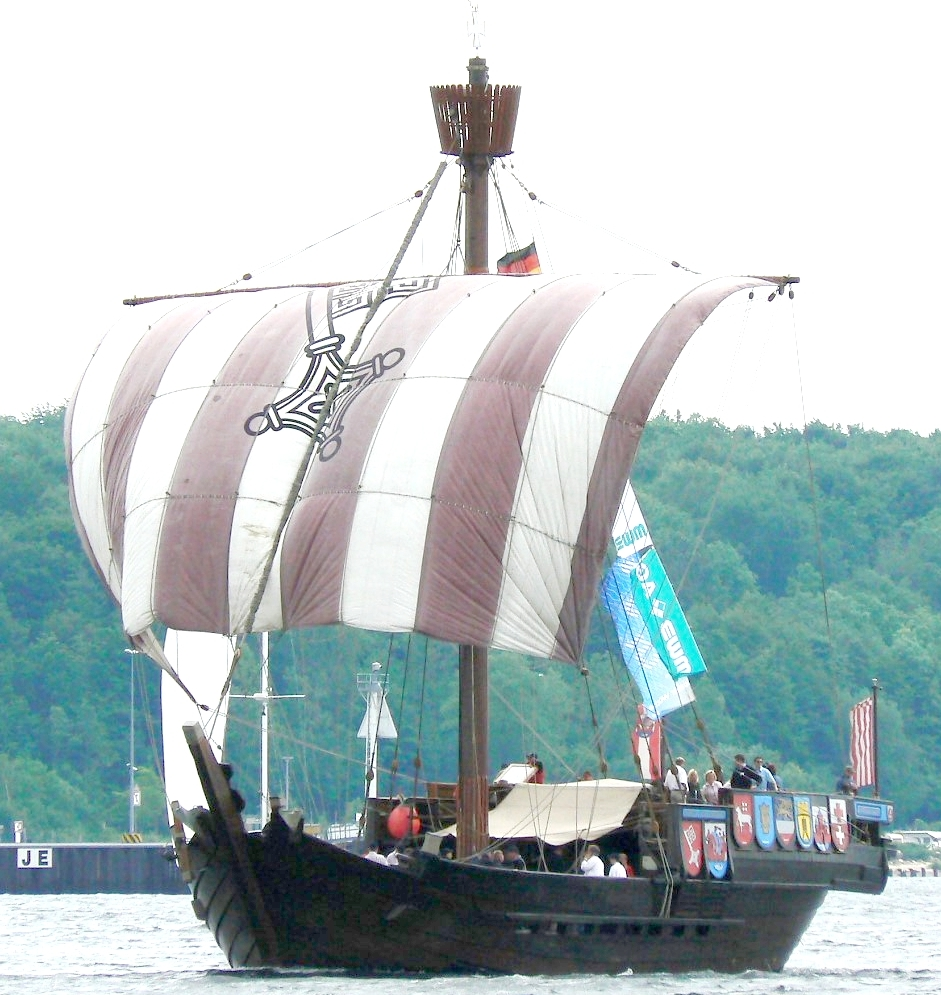
In 1962 a well-preserved wreck of a cog dated to 1380 was found near Bremen, Germany. This is a full-size reproduction. Merchant vessels such as these formed the bulk of the English fleet.

English reinforcements took a long time to arrive. A small English force, 234 men, arrived under Sir Walter Mauny in May 1342 and relieved the siege of Hennebont. The flow of events went against the Montfortists in the face of the huge military superiority of the French. By July Joanna had been forced back to the far west of Brittany and was besieged in the port of Brest, the only remaining fortified place held by her faction. Charles of Blois and a large army had invested the town and fourteen mercenary galleys, hired from Genoa, blockaded it from the sea. Brest was on the brink of surrender when the English arrived on 18 August. Their fleet of 260 ships, including an unknown number of galleys, took the Genoese by surprise. The Genoese fled and 11 of their ships were burnt.

A map of Brittany, with modern administrative boundaries, showing the locations of some of the places mentioned in the text

The English ships carried 1,350 men, a force far smaller than that of the French besieging Brest. However, seeing so many English ships crowded into the Brest Roads and the English vanguard disembarking onto the beach, the French anticipated an attack by a vast host. Charles promptly broke off the siege and withdrew, abandoning western Brittany, where the populace strongly favoured the Montfort cause. Part of the French force retreated along the south coast of Brittany, but the bulk of the army accompanied him to Guingamp. Here he concentrated his forces and called up local levies. The English were commanded by William, Earl of Northampton who was reinforced by 800 men under Robert of Artois a few days after landing. He also absorbed several small English forces and an unknown number of John of Montfort's Breton partisans. Edward III was planning to follow on with a substantial force and so Northampton's first mission was to secure a port on the north coast of Brittany.

Morlaix is approximately halfway between Brest and Guingamp. It was a town with strong fortifications and a secure harbour 50 kilometres (30 mi) from Brest. Charles left it well provisioned and well garrisoned before withdrawing a further 60 kilometres (40 mi) along the north coast road. Northampton marched on Morlaix, taking over the territory to the west of it. Arriving on 3 September and finding the garrison well-prepared to stand a siege he assaulted the town. This lasted most of the day, was pressed hard, and was eventually repulsed with the English suffering many casualties. They then settled down for a regular siege. It is possible Northampton was anticipating further reinforcement by Montfortist Bretons. Charles was now aware that his force greatly outnumbered the English, although not by as much as Charles had hoped. Edward's contingent was still in England waiting for shipping to be assembled and the French mistakenly believed it would be used in northern France, probably disembarking in Picardy. An army was gathered to confront this imagined threat, including many men transferred from Brittany.

== Opposing forces ==
Northampton's 1,350 men are described by the historian Jonathan Sumption as being half men-at-arms and half archers; Kelly DeVries says most were archers. They were joined by the survivors of the 234-strong advance party which had arrived three months earlier – of whom 34 were men-at-arms and 200 archers – and at least one other group of English troops of 110 men. A few days after arriving they were reinforced by a further 800 men from England, whose composition is not known. The historian Andrew Ayton concludes like Sumption that the English consisted of about the same number of archers as men-at arms. The balance of the English army was made up of Bretons with variable levels of equipment, training and commitment. The total under Northampton's command has been estimated to be between 3,000 and 5,000. It is unclear how many of this force took part in the subsequent battle, as a detachment of unknown size was left to contain the garrison of Morlaix. Ayton suggests a lower figure of 1,100 English and "an indeterminate number of Bretons".

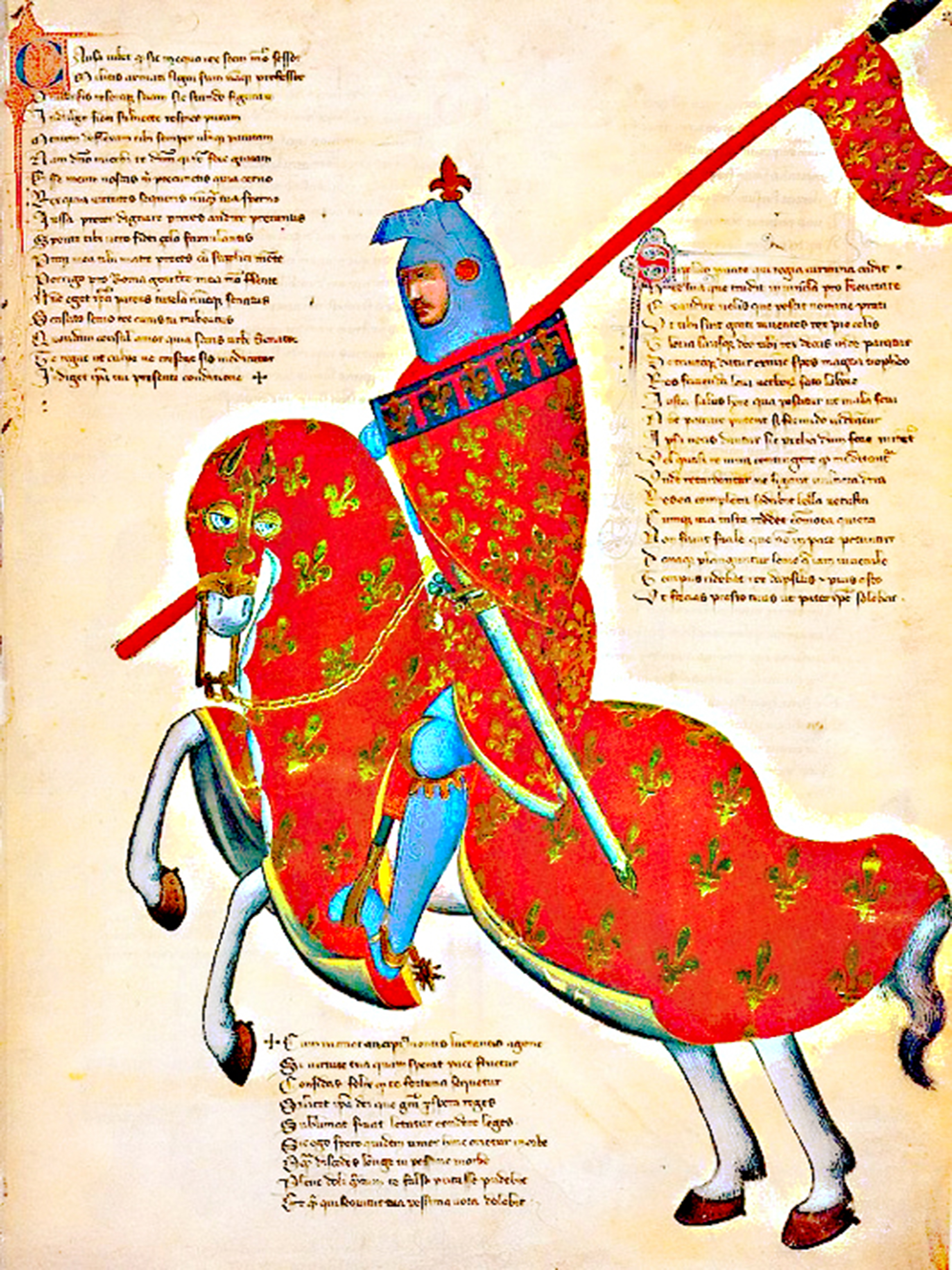
A contemporary image of a mounted man-at-arms: note the lack of armour on the horse.

There is disagreement among modern historians on the size of the French army. Three contemporary chroniclers give 20,000; 3,000 cavalry, 1,500 mercenary infantry, and levy infantry "without number" (very many); and just "a huge army". The historian Alfred Burne says it "attained prodigious numbers" and mentions 15,000 while dismissing earlier estimates of 30,000. DeVries writes "perhaps ... as many as 15,000", footnoting this to Burne and mentioning other estimates. He accepts that the English were heavily outnumbered, "perhaps by as many as four to one". Marilyn Livingstone and Morgen Witzel suggest a total of between 10,000 and 15,000. Sumption states that Charles of Blois had 3,000 cavalry, 1,500 professional infantry and an unspecified number of Breton levy infantry, describing the last as "a motley force". Matthew Bennett has suggested "perhaps 3,000 men-at-arms and 1,500 Genoese mercenaries" as Charles' total force, which he opines was considerably more men than in the English army; a little later he also mentions lightly armoured Breton infantry leading the French attack. The French army was "several times larger" than the English according to John Wagner.

The men-at-arms of both armies wore a quilted gambeson under mail armour which covered the body and limbs. This was supplemented by varying amounts of plate armour on the body and limbs, more so for wealthier and more experienced men. Heads were protected by bascinets: open-faced iron or steel helmets, with mail attached to the lower edge of the helmet to protect the throat, neck and shoulders. A moveable visor (face guard) protected the face. Heater shields, typically made from thin wood overlaid with leather, were carried. The English men-at-arms were all dismounted. The weapons they used are not recorded, but in similar battles they used their lances as pikes, cut them down to use as short spears, or fought with swords and battle axes. They were mounted on entirely unarmoured horses and carried wooden lances, usually ash, tipped with iron and approximately 4 metres (13 ft) long.

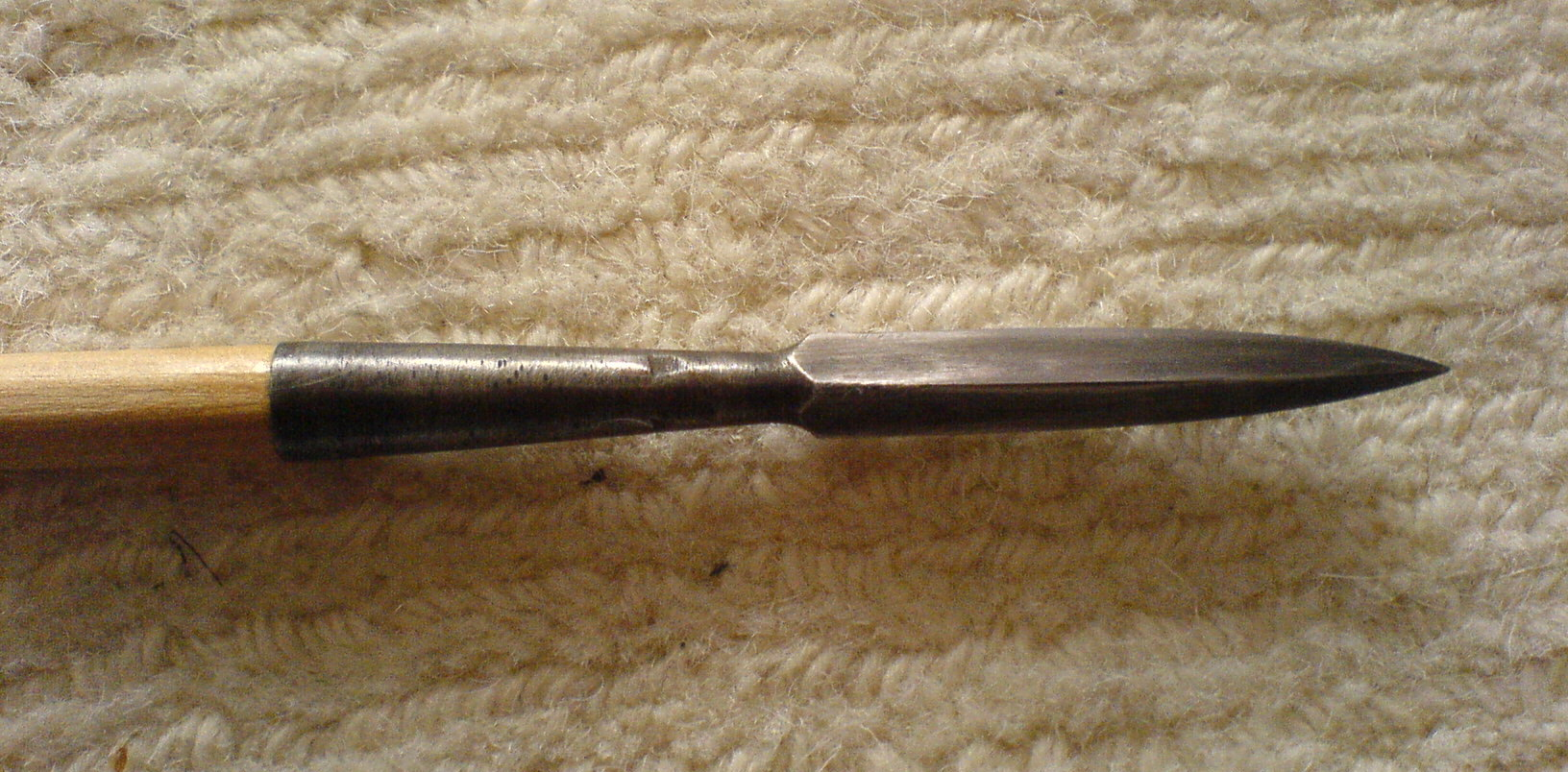
A modern replica of a bodkin point arrowhead used by English longbows to penetrate armour

The longbow, which all of the English archers used, (Note: All of Northampton's troops are described as either English or Breton. It is known that in December the English army included many Welsh troops; but by then it had been heavily reinforced, at least some of the reinforcements being Welsh.) was unique to them; it took up to 10 years to master and an experienced archer could discharge up to ten arrows per minute well over 300 metres (980 ft). (Note: This range is given by material scientists and is supported by most modern historians. Some historians argue that the range of a longbow would not have exceeded 200 metres (660 ft).) Computer analysis by Warsaw University of Technology in 2017 demonstrated that heavy bodkin point arrows could penetrate typical plate armour of the time at 225 metres (738 ft). The depth of penetration would be slight at that range, but would have increased as the range closed or against armour of less than the best quality available at the time. (Note: When computer modelling from 2006 was matched against the performance of replica bows, the material scientist P. L. Pratt found these to be "in good agreement with experimental measurements".) Contemporary sources speak of arrows frequently piercing armour. Archers carried one quiver of 24 arrows as standard. It was common for them to each be issued with one or two extra quivers when a battle was expected, for a maximum total of 72 arrows per man. Even this was only sufficient for perhaps fifteen minutes of continuous shooting, although as the battle wore on the rate of fire would slow. Regular resupply of ammunition would be required from the wagons to the rear; the archers would also venture forward during pauses in the fighting to retrieve arrows.

The weapons used by either the mercenary infantry or the Breton levies deployed by the French are not known. Livingstone and Witzel contend that the French "did not have any archers"; Alfred Burne takes at least some and possibly all of their mercenary infantry to be crossbowmen. Bennett also mentions the presence of Genoese crossbowmen in the French army. (Note: As there were few archers in France, they were often recruited from abroad, typically Genoa; their foreign origin led to them frequently being labelled mercenaries. They were professional soldiers and in battle were usually protected from missiles by pavises – very large shields with their own bearers, behind each of which three crossbowmen could shelter.) A trained crossbowman could shoot his weapon approximately twice a minute to a shorter effective range than a longbowman of about 200 metres (660 ft).

== Battle ==
=== Prelude ===
Charles, now more accurately informed about the size of Northampton's force, decided to relieve Morlaix and his army marched back to the west. Not wishing to become pinned between Charles and the garrison of Morlaix, Northampton took most of his troops on a night march on 29/30 September. The large village of Lanmeur was 11 kilometres (7 mi) north east of Morlaix and a little before reaching it the English found a suitable defensive position and dug in. They positioned themselves in a line across the road with a gentle slope down to a stream which bent to cover their right flank. A wood 100 metres (330 ft) behind them was too dense for cavalry to penetrate readily and so positioned their baggage train there – it would act as a rallying point if the battle went against them. Northampton decided to fight defensively and on foot, and so the horses were also left in the wood. A ditch and pit traps were dug a little in front of the line and camouflaged with branches and grass. (Note: At the battle of Crecy four years later, where Northampton held a senior position and according to Bennett "may have influenced the tactics", pit traps dug by English archers are described as being 30 centimetres (1 ft) deep and 30 cm wide.) The English deployed in what had become their standard formation, with the dismounted men-at-arms in the centre flanked on each side by archers.

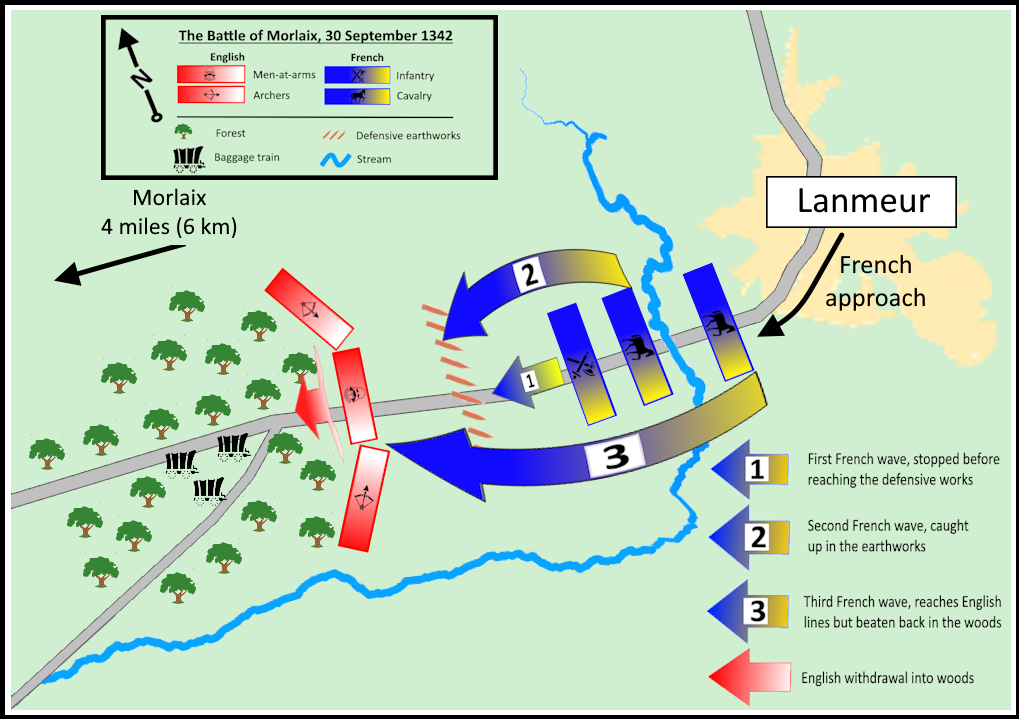
Approximate troop movements at the battle of Morlaix, 30 September 1342

Charles of Blois' army was advancing west along the coast road and it is possible his cavalry spent the night in the village of Lanmeur with the infantry bivouacked further east. Once the English position just to the south west was identified on the morning of 30 September Charles spent some time organising his army into battle formation. He divided it into three divisions, or battles, one behind the other, with wide gaps between. Several accounts state that the foremost division consisted largely of Breton levy infantry, the need to pass them through the cavalry in the village explains why the French did not start their attack until about 3:00 pm.

=== French attacks ===
The first French division advanced against the English. Modern historians differ as to its composition. The majority state that it was made up of Breton levy infantry, but Sumption writes that it was predominately Franco-Breton mounted men-at-arms, and DeVries that it was a mix. The attackers crossed a brook parallel to the English line and made their way up a gentle slope. The English archers loosed their arrows once this massed target was within long range and the advance dissolved into chaos. None of the attackers got as far as the concealed trench in front of the English line before fleeing back towards Lanmeur.

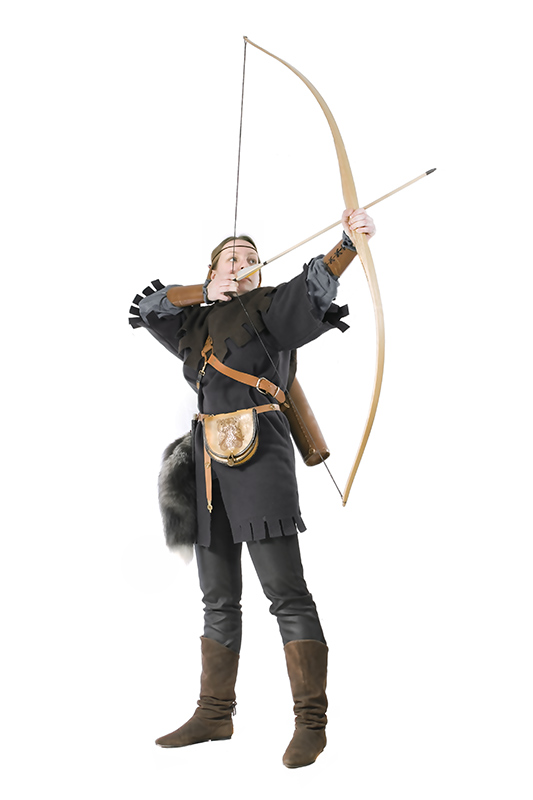
A modern reenactor demonstrating a longbow draw

There was a pause, and possibly some consultation among Charles' command group, then the second division advanced. This was made up entirely of mounted men-at-arms. They launched a determined but disordered charge at the English, which collapsed as the leading horses fell into the concealed ditch and the following horses and riders stumbled over them. The English archers plied a deliberately aimed hail of arrows into this large, stationary, close-range target to great effect. Sumption writes that "there were appalling casualties", Wagner of "terrible execution". A small group of French cavalry, perhaps 200 men, made their way over this obstacle and pressed home their charge. They closed with the English dismounted men-at-arms and broke into their position, but were so few and so disordered that they were cut off, surrounded and all either killed or captured. The prisoners were sent back to the baggage laager.

There was another pause in the fighting, longer than the previous one, as Charles and his colleagues contemplated the situation. The remaining French division outnumbered the English army on its own; like the second division it consisted entirely of mounted men-at-arms. Eventually it was committed to a third attack. This may be attributable to the chivalric ideals held by knights of the time: nobles may have preferred to die in battle, rather than dishonourably decline to fight, especially against an outnumbered enemy. Northampton was concerned that the English archers were running low on arrows and that the ditch was less of an obstacle, both because it was no longer a surprise and because it was bridged in many places by the dead and wounded bodies of men and horses. As a result, when he saw the French massing for a further assault he ordered a withdrawal into the wood to the rear. There the English took up a defensive position just inside the wood and facing in all directions. As the English had anticipated, the French mounted men-at-arms had difficulty forcing their way through the forested area and many were shot by English archers, despite their shortage of ammunition. Confounded, the French pulled back, ringed the wood with outposts and besieged the English army. Bennett and Burne both comment that this part of the battle was made more difficult for the French because their mercenary crossbowmen had deserted.

Geoffrey of Charny as depicted in the 14th century

The English were trapped in the wood with little food, possibly for several days. Eventually they broke out at night and made their way back to Morlaix, where they continued the siege. They took with them 150 captured French knights, (Note: Captured men-at-arms would be held for ransom, usually substantial sums.) one of whom was Geoffrey of Charny, who had led the first mounted division to attack. (Note: Which was either the first or the second attack overall, depending on the source. Charny was taken captive to England, but soon released to allow him to raise his ransom. By the end of the year he was back in Brittany fighting the English again. He was to go on to become a senior French commander, the author of several highly regarded books on chivalry and the bearer of the Oriflamme, the French royal battle banner.) The number killed or wounded on each side is not known, although total French losses were heavy, with one modern historian stating that thousands were killed. English casualties were light; there is mention of one named man-at-arms being killed and one badly wounded.

== Aftermath ==
The garrison of Morlaix held out and when Edward III arrived at Brest on 26 October the siege was abandoned and Northampton marched to join him. Charles and the French survivors withdrew east after the battle. Campaigning in Brittany was interrupted by the Truce of Malestroit, agreed on 19 January 1343. Hostilities did not recommence until June 1345. The eastern and southern parts of Brittany were mostly held by Charles of Blois, who continued to be strongly supported by the French, while western and northern Brittany continued to be largely Montfort or English controlled.

Northampton went on to have an outstanding military and diplomatic career. He campaigned with Edward III in 1359–1360 and was one of the negotiators of the Treaty of Brétigny in 1360 which ended the Edwardian phase of the war with a stunning English victory. Charles of Blois continued to fight for control of Brittany. He was captured by the English in 1347, released in 1356 and killed in 1364 at the battle of Auray. The Treaty of Guérande ended the Breton Civil War the following year with a Montfortist victory.

== Historiography ==
Morlaix established a strong English presence in Brittany and restarted the Breton Civil War when it was thought nearly over. It was the first major land battle of the Hundred Years' War and the first time the English tactic of deploying their men-at-arms on foot with massed longbowmen on either flank was seen outside Britain. It was also the first time this approach had been used against mounted opponents, rather than infantry, and it was clear that when used correctly it was capable of defeating them.

Livingstone and Witzel suggest it is difficult to take lessons from the battle as "Charles ... was a military incompetent". Sumption states that the French behaved in the same wrong-headed way they usually did in battles of the 1340s. Some historians see the battle of Morlaix as part of the development of English tactics during the first half of the 14th century. They suggest that pitched battles against the Scots during the previous 30 years had enabled the English to develop an effective combination of their different troop types and agree on the devastating effectiveness of English bowmen and men-at-arms when properly coordinated. Wagner describes this as "the great tactical innovation of the war". Historians agree that the tactics used at Morlaix were those which won the great English victories of Crécy in 1346 and Poitiers in 1356, and that Northampton's victory was the start of a military ascendancy for the English which lasted for 20 years.

== Notes, citations and sources ==
=== Sources ===
- Allmand, Christopher (2001). The Hundred Years' War: England and France at War, c. 1300–c. 1450. Cambridge: Cambridge University Press. ISBN 978-0-521-31923-2.
- Ayton, Andrew (1999). Knights and Warhorses: Military Service and the English Aristocracy under Edward III. Boydel Press: Woodbridge, Suffolk. ISBN 978-0-85115-739-9.
- Ayton, Andrew (2007) [2005]. "The Battle of Crécy: Context and Significance". In Ayton, Andrew & Preston, Philip (eds.). The Battle of Crécy, 1346. Woodbridge, Suffolk: Boydell Press. pp. 1–34. ISBN 978-1-84383-115-0.
- Ayton, Andrew (2007b) [2005]. "The English Army at Crécy". In Ayton, Andrew & Preston, Philip (eds.). The Battle of Crécy, 1346. Woodbridge, Suffolk: Boydell Press. pp. 159–252. ISBN 978-1-84383-115-0.
- Bachrach, Bernard S.; Bachrach, David S. (2017). Warfare in Medieval Europe c.400–c.1453. Abington, Oxfordshire; New York: Routledge. ISBN 978-1-138-88765-7.
- Ayton, Andrew (2007c) [2005]. "Crécy and the Chroniclers". In Ayton, Andrew & Preston, Philip (eds.). The Battle of Crécy, 1346. Woodbridge, Suffolk: Boydell Press. pp. 287–350. ISBN 978-1-84383-115-0.
- Ayton, Andrew & Preston, Philip (2007) [2005]. "Topography and Archery: Further Reflections on the Battle of Crécy". In Ayton, Andrew & Preston, Philip (eds.). The Battle of Crécy, 1346. Woodbridge, Suffolk: Boydell Press. pp. 351–378. ISBN 978-1-84383-115-0.
- Bennett, Matthew (1999). "The Development of Battle Tactics in the Hundred Years War". In Curry, Anne; Hughes, Michael (eds.). Arms, Armies and Fortifications in the Hundred Years War. Woodbridge, Suffolk: Boydell & Brewer. pp. 1–20. ISBN 978-0-85115-755-9.
- Burne, Alfred (1999) [1955]. The Crécy War. Ware, Hertfordshire: Wordsworth Editions. ISBN 978-1-84022-210-4.
- Curry, Anne (2002). The Hundred Years' War 1337–1453. Essential Histories. Oxford: Osprey Publishing. ISBN 978-1-84176-269-2.
- Cushway, Graham (2011). Edward III and the War at Sea. Woodbridge, Suffolk: Boydell Press. ISBN 978-1-84383-621-6.
- DeVries, Kelly (1998) [1996]. Infantry Warfare in the Early Fourteenth Century. Woodbridge, Suffolk: Boydell Press. ISBN 978-0-85115-567-8.
- Edge, David; Paddock, John (1988). Arms & Armor of the Medieval Knight. New York: Crescent Books. ISBN 978-0-517-64468-3.
- Graham-Goering, Erika (2020). Princely Power in Late Medieval France: Jeanne de Penthièvre and the War for Brittany. Cambridge: Cambridge University Press. ISBN 978-1-108-80554-4.
- Harari, Yuval N. (2007). "For a Sack-full of Gold Écus: Calais 1350". Special Operations in the Age of Chivalry, 1100–1550. Woodbridge, Suffolk: Boydell Press. pp. 109–124. ISBN 978-1-84383-292-8.
- Jones, Michael (1988). The Creation of Brittany: A Late Medieval State. London: Hambledon Press. ISBN 978-0-907628-80-4.
- Kaeuper, Richard W. & Kennedy, Elspeth (1996). The Book of Chivalry of Geoffroi de Charny: Text, Context, and Translation. Philadelphia: University of Pennsylvania Press. ISBN 978-0-8122-3348-3.
- King, Andy (2017). "'Then a Great Misfortune Befell Them': the Laws of War on Surrender and the Killing of Prisoners on the Battlefield in the Hundred Years War" (PDF). Journal of Medieval History. 43 (1): 106–117. doi:10.1080/03044181.2016.1236502. S2CID 159619516. Archived from the original (PDF) on 22 October 2019.
- Livingstone, Marilyn & Witzel, Morgen (2004). The Road to Crécy: The English Invasion of France, 1346. London: Routledge. ISBN 978-0-582-78420-8.
- Mallett, Michael (1974). Mercenaries and their Masters: Warfare in Renaissance Italy. London: Bodley Head. ISBN 978-0-370-10502-4.
- Magier, Mariusz; Nowak, Adrian; et al. (2017). "Numerical Analysis of English Bows used in Battle of Crécy". Problemy Techniki Uzbrojenia. 142 (2): 69–85. doi:10.5604/01.3001.0010.5152. ISSN 1230-3801.
- Mitchell, Russell (2008). "The Longbow-Crossbow Shootout at Crécy (1346): Has the "Rate of Fire Commonplace" Been Overrated?". In L. J. Andrew Villalon & Donald J. Kagay (eds.). The Hundred Years War (Part II): Different Vistas. Leiden: Brill. pp. 233–257. ISBN 978-90-04-16821-3.
- Mortimer, Ian (2007). The Perfect King: The Life of Edward III, Father of the English Nation. London: Pimlico. ISBN 978-1-84413-530-1.
- Ormrod, W. Mark (1990). Edward III. New Haven: Yale University Press. ISBN 978-0-300-11910-7. OCLC 1039705847.
- Pratt, P. L. (2010). "Testing the Bows". In Hardy, Robert (ed.). Longbow: A Social and Military History. Yeovil, Somerset: Haynes Publishing. pp. 205–217. ISBN 978-1-85260-620-6.
- Prestwich, Michael (2007) [2005]. "The Battle of Crécy". In Ayton, Andrew & Preston, Philip (eds.). The Battle of Crécy, 1346. Woodbridge, Suffolk: Boydell Press. pp. 139–157. ISBN 978-1-84383-115-0.
- Rodger, N.A.M. (2004). The Safeguard of the Sea: A Naval History of Britain. 660–1649. Vol. I. London: Penguin. ISBN 978-0-14-029724-9.
- Rogers, Clifford (1998). "The Efficacy of the English Longbow: A Reply to Kelly DeVries" (PDF). War in History. 5 (2): 233–242. doi:10.1177/096834459800500205. S2CID 161286935. Archived from the original (PDF) on 3 February 2019.
- Rogers, Clifford J. (2008). "The Battle of Agincourt". In Villalon, L. J. Andrew; Donald J., Kagay (eds.). The Hundred Years' War (Part II): Different Vistas. Leiden: Brill. pp. 37–132. ISBN 978-90-474-4283-7.
- Rogers, Clifford (2014). War Cruel and Sharp: English Strategy under Edward III, 1327–1360. Woodbridge, Suffolk: Boydell Press. ISBN 978-0-85115-804-4. Archived from the original on 15 March 2022.
- Rose, Susan (2007). The Medieval Sea. London: Bloomsbury. ISBN 978-1-85285-563-5.
- Schnerb, Bertrand (2007) [2005]. "Vassals, Allies and Mercenaries: The French Army Before and After 1346". In Ayton, Andrew; Preston, Philip (eds.). The Battle of Crécy, 1346. Woodbridge, Suffolk: Boydell Press. pp. 265–272. ISBN 978-1-84383-115-0.
- Strickland, Matthew & Hardy, Robert (2011). The Great Warbow: From Hastings to the Mary Rose. Somerset: J. H. Haynes & Co. ISBN 978-0-85733-090-1.
- Sumption, Jonathan (1990). The Hundred Years War 1: Trial by Battle. London: Faber & Faber. ISBN 978-0-571-13895-1.
- Sumption, Jonathan (1999). Trial by Fire. The Hundred Years' War. Vol. II. London: Faber and Faber. ISBN 978-0-571-13896-8.
- Tout, T. F. (1904). "The Tactics of the Battles of Boroughbridge and Morlaix". The English Historical Review. 19 (76): 711–715. doi:10.1093/ehr/XIX.LXXVI.711. OCLC 474766029.
- Visser, Nils; Snijder, Willeke (2014). "The Flame of Britanny: Jeanne de Flandres". Medieval Warfare. 4 (2): 33–38. JSTOR 48578335.
- Wagner, John A. (2006). Encyclopedia of the Hundred Years War. Woodbridge, Suffolk: Greenwood. ISBN 978-0-313-32736-0.
- Waller, Jonathan & Waller, John (2010). "The Personal Carriage of Arrows from Hastings to the Mary Rose". Arms & Armour. 7 (2): 55–177. doi:10.1179/174161210X12810012151357. OCLC 4636564871.
