= Lefteri =

19th-century Greek bandit leader

Lefteri (?–1872) was a 19th-century Greek bandit leader active in the area around the Ottoman capital Constantinople and the region of Bithynia.

== Life ==
He gained legendary repute in the province. In the late 1860s his men numbered some 400. Eventually he became confident enough to open a regular office in Bursa to sell his safe-conducts to merchants and travelers. Like other bandit bands of Bithynia they were described as being reasonable and professional men specialized in Armenian merchants. They would treat female hostages chivalrously and would, if not killed first, ask to be pardoned by the Sultan at the end of their career, this was often a successful case. Lefteri eventually offered to retire to Greece with his gains but the Turkish government refused. In Lefteri's case there seemed to be religious antagonism between the Orthodox Greek robber and the Muslim villagers. He was described as "rather a chivalrous thief" by Reverend Edwin Davis.

Near İzmir, in 1870, a band of seven Greeks from the islands under the command of Manouli, his former lieutenant in Bithynia were exterminated by Turkish troops. In 1871 Lefteri and his sixteen men attacked and robbed an isolated farm of an Englishman in Yalova. The British ambassador complained to the Ottoman authorities after which his gang was vigorously pursued and broke up. He himself was killed in 1872 by his two remaining men.

== Portrayal in the Cornhill Magazine ==
In the Cornhill Magazine of 1871 Lefteri was portrayed with "traits of operatic amity but capable of coldblooded murder". In a story mixed with facts and fiction, an anonymous English lady traveler, describes him as besieging a model farm, owned by an Englishmen in İznik and demanding £1,000 from the English party. The English host lowered the price and gave a written note of £500. Pleased, Lefteri assured the English of their lives as they were Christian and withdrew after boasting the number of Turks he had exterminated. The lady well remembered his latest feat of roasting two peasants alive.

Lefteri's gang looked like scoundrels to her while he himself was finely dressed with a fez and white turban, and wore a picture of the Lady Madonna, under whose special protection he considered himself to be. One year later he was killed by his own men and the note of the Englishman was found on his body.
