= Richard Unger =

American historian

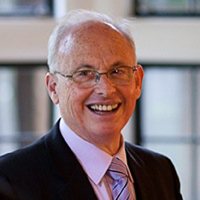
Richard W. Unger

Richard W. Unger (born in Huntington, West Virginia, in 1942) is an emeritus professor of Medieval History at the University of British Columbia and a specialist in European maritime history in the medieval period. He served as Second Vice-President of the Medieval Academy of America in 2011, First Vice-President in 2012, and President in 2013.

== Publications ==
- Dutch Ship Design in the Fifteenth and Sixteenth Centuries (1973)
- Dutch Shipbuilding before 1800: Ships and Guilds (1978)
- The Ship in the Medieval Economy, 600-1600 (1980)
- The Art of Medieval Technology: Images of Noah the Shipbuilder (1991)
- Ships and Shipping in the North Sea and Atlantic, 1400-1800 (1997)
- A History of Brewing in Holland, 900-1900 (2001)
- Beer in the Middle Ages and the Renaissance (2004)
- Ships on Maps: Pictures of Power in Renaissance Europe (2010)
- Shipping and Economic Growth, 1350-1850 (2011)
- with Robert Allen, Global Commodity Prices Database
