= Matthew Bennett (historian) =

British historian

Matthew Bennett (born 1954) is a historian specialising in Medieval warfare.

== Life ==
He taught as a Senior Lecturer in the Department of Communication and Applied Behavioural Science at The Royal Military Academy, Sandhurst, UK, for thirty years, retiring in 2014. He holds a degree in History and an MA in Medieval History from King's College, London, where he studied under R. Allen Brown, and is a fellow of both the Society of Antiquaries and the Royal Historical Society. In 2011 he was awarded a PhD By Means of Published Works by the University of Northampton. He is the author and editor of books and articles on Medieval warfare.

== Publications ==
- Agincourt 1415. Osprey. 1991. ISBN 978-1-85532-132-8.
- With Nicholas Hooper: Cambridge Atlas of Warfare: The Middle Ages 768-1487. Cambridge University Press. 1996. ISBN 978-0-521-44049-3.
- Campaigns of the Norman Conquest. Osprey. 2001. ISBN 978-1-84176-228-9.
- With Jim Bradbury, Kelly DeVries, Iain Dickie, and Phyllis Jestice: Fighting Techniques of the Medieval World. Thomas Dunne. 2005. ISBN 978-0-312-34820-5.
- The Medieval World at War. London: Thames & Hudson. 2009. ISBN 978-0-500-25156-0.
