= James Williamson (historian) =

James Alexander Williamson (1886 – 31 December 1964) was a prominent English writer on maritime history and expert on the John Cabot voyages. He also wrote many other books on explorers, exploration and discovery. James Williamson wrote of James Cook: the greatest explorer of his age and the greatest maritime explorer of his country in any age.

== Early life and education ==
The son of James Ireland Williamson, he was educated at Watford Grammar School and the University of London, where he earned his B.A. in 1906, his M.A. in 1909 and was awarded a Ph.D. in 1924 with a thesis on "The Caribbee Islands under the proprietary patents". He married Ruth Chappele.

== Professional career ==
In 1910, he became an assistant master in history at Westminster City School, a post he held until 1937. His teaching career was interrupted in 1914–1919 by service in the British Army. In 1926, the University of London selected him as the first recipient of the Julian Corbett Prize in Naval History. He was Ford's Lecturer in British History at Oxford University in 1939.

He served as a vice-president of both the Hakluyt Society and the Historical Association. At the time of his death, he resided at 2 Laburnham Grove, Chichester.

== Published works ==
- Maritime Enterprise, 1485–1558. Oxford: Clarendon Press, 1913.
- The Foundation and Growth of the British Empire. London: Macmillan, 1916; 1953.
- English Colonies in Guiana and on the Amazon: 1604–1668. Oxford: Clarendon Press, 1923.
- Migration Within the Empire by E. A. Belcher and James A. Williamson. London: W. Collins, 1924.
- Europe Overseas. London: Oxford University Press, 1925.
- The Caribbee Islands Under the Proprietary Patents. London: Oxford University Press, 1926.
- The Tercentenary of Barbados. Offprint from: Blackwood's Magazine. February 1927.
- Sir John Hawkins: The Time and the Man. Oxford: The Clarendon Press, 1927.
- Richard Hakluyt and the English Voyages, by George Bruner Parks; edited, with an introduction, by James A. Williamson. New York: American Geographical Society, 1928.
- The Voyages of the Cabots and the English Discovery of North America under Henry VII and Henry VIII. London: Argonaut Press, 1929, reprinted 1971.
- The Evolution of England: A Commentary on the Facts. Oxford: Clarendon Press. 1931. Archived from the original on 8 December 2015 – via Questia.
- A Short History of British Expansion. Vol. 1 and 2 (2nd ed.). Macmillan. Archived from the original on 8 December 2015 – via Questia.
- The Observations of Sir Richard Hawkins: edited from the text of 1622 with introduction, notes and appendices, by James A. Williamson ... Illustrated with four maps. London: Argonaut, 1933.
- The Voyages of John and Sebastian Cabot . London: Published for the Historical Association by G. Bell, 1937.
- The Age of Drake. London: Adam & Charles Black. 1938. Archived from the original on 31 October 2015 – via Questia.
- A Voyage to New Holland by William Dampier; edited, with introduction, notes and illustrative documents, by James A. Williamson. London: The Argonaut Press, 1939.
- The Ocean in English History: Being the Ford Lectures. Oxford: Clarendon Press. 1941; 1948. Archived from the original on 2012-12-29 – via Questia.
- Great Britain and the Empire: A Discursive History. London : A. & C. Black, 1944.
- Cook and the Opening of the Pacific. London: Hodder & Stoughton, 1946
- The British Empire and Commonwealth: A History for Senior Forms. London: Macmillan, 1946; 1952.
- Common Errors in History by members of the Historical Association. London: Pub. for the Historical Association by P. S. King & Staples limited, 1945.
- Hawkins of Plymouth: A New History of Sir John Hawkins and of the Other Members of His Family Prominent in Tudor England. London: Black, 1949.
- Sir Francis Drake. London: Collins, 1951.
- The Tudor Age. New York: Longmans, Green. 1979. Archived from the original on 8 December 2015 – via Questia.
- The English Channel: A History. London: Collins, 1959.
- A Notebook of Commonwealth History. 1959; London: Macmillan; New York: St. Martin's Press., 1967.
- The Cabot Voyages and Bristol Discovery Under Henry VII, With Cartography of the Voyages by R. A. Skelton. Cambridge: Published for the Hakluyt Society at the Cambridge University Press, 1962.
- Great Britain and the Commonwealth. London: Black, 1965.
- Westward Ho! by Charles Kingsley; introduction by James A. Williamson. London: Dent; New York: Dutton, 1976.
- In addition, he was a regular contributor to Blackwood's Magazine, The Geographical Journal, and History. He also contributed to The Cambridge History of the British Empire and Johnson's England.
- Who Was Who, 1961–1970
