= Anne Curry =

British medieval and military historian

Anne Curry FRHistS
- Born: 27 May 1954 (age 72); Chester-le-Street, Durham, England
- Board member of: Royal Armouries

Academic background
- Education: University of Manchester; Teesside Polytechnic
- Thesis: Military Organisation in Lancastrian Normandy 1422-50
- Doctoral advisor: A. J. Pollard

Academic work
- Discipline: History
- Sub-discipline: England in the Late Middle Ages; Military history
- Institutions: University of Reading; University of Southampton

Anne Elizabeth Curry (who publishes as Anne Curry and A. E. Curry; born 27 May 1954) is an English historian and Officer of Arms.

== Career ==
Curry is emeritus Professor of Medieval history at the University of Southampton and was dean of the Faculty of Humanities there between 2010 and 2018. She is former editor of the Journal of Medieval History, and a specialist in the Hundred Years' War.

She graduated with BA and MA degrees from the University of Manchester before obtaining a PhD from Teesside Polytechnic on "Military Organisation in Lancastrian Normandy 1422–50". Curry was appointed to a lectureship at the University of Reading in 1978, before moving to the University of Southampton.

Between 2006 and 2009, Curry was lead investigator on The Soldier in Later Medieval England project, which created an online searchable database containing over 250,000 names of soldiers recorded as serving the English crown between 1369 and 1453, which evolved from her PhD research card catalogue.

In 2015, Curry played a key part in the commemorations around the 600th anniversary of the Battle of Agincourt.

She worked on the Centre Azincourt 1415 museum at Azincourt.

Curry was president of the Historical Association from 2008 to 2011. She was also a vice-president of the Royal Historical Society.

Curry was Project Director on The Gascon Rolls (1317–1467) project between 2015 and 2019.

In 2022, she was appointed Arundel Herald Extraordinary and in that role took part in the coronation of King Charles III and Queen Camilla on 6 May 2023.

Curry has been a Trustee of the Royal Armouries and chaired of The Battlefields Trust, and was Upper Warden and Master of the Worshipful Company of Fletchers. In 2023, she was admitted as the first female freeman of the Worshipful Company of Bowyers since 1813. In 2026, she was awarded the Medlicott Medal by the Historical Association.

== Published works ==
- Curry, A. E., "The impact of war and occupation on urban life in Normandy, 1417–1450", in French History, 1 (1987), 157–181.
- Curry, A. E., "The nationality of men-at-arms serving in English armies in Normandy and the pays de conquete (1415–1450)", in Reading Medieval Studies 18 (1992), 135–163.
- Curry, Anne with Hughes, Michael (editors). (1994). Arms, Armies and Fortifications in the Hundred Years War. The Boydell Press (UK) ISBN 978-0-85115-365-0
- Curry, Anne with Bates, David (1994). England and Normandy in the Middle Ages. Hambledon Continuum. ISBN 978-1-85285-083-8
- Curry, Anne with Matthew, Elizabeth (editors) (2000). The Fifteenth Century: Concepts and Patterns of Service in the Later Middle Ages (vol. 1: Fifteenth Century). The Boydell Press (UK). ISBN 978-0-85115-814-3
- Curry, Anne (ed.) (2000) Agincourt 1415. Tempus (UK). ISBN 978-0-7524-1780-6
- Curry, Anne (2000). The Battle of Agincourt: Sources and Interpretations. The Boydell Press (UK) ISBN 978-0-85115-802-0
- Curry, Anne and Matthew, E., Concepts and Patterns of Service in the Late Middle Ages (Woodbridge, 2000)
- Curry, Anne (2003) The Hundred Years' War. British History in Perspective series, Palgrave Macmillan; 2nd revised edition. ISBN 978-0-333-92435-8
- Curry, Anne (2005) The Parliament Rolls of Medieval England 1275–1504. Henry VI 1422–31. Boydell & Brewer (UK).
- Curry, Anne (2005) The Parliament Rolls of Medieval England 1275–1504. Henry VI 1432–1445. Boydell & Brewer (UK).
- Curry, Anne (2005). Agincourt: A New History. Tempus (UK). ISBN 978-0-7524-2828-4
- Curry, Anne, (with Robert Hardy) (2006) Agincourt 1415: The Archers' Story. Tempus (UK). ISBN 978-0-75244-566-3
- Curry, Anne (2015) Henry V: Playboy Prince to Warrior King. Penguin Books (UK). ISBN 978-0-141-98743-9
