= Michael Jones (historian) =

British historian

- Born: 5 December 1940 (age 85); Wrexham, Wales

Academic work
- Discipline: history
- Institutions: University of Nottingham
- Main interests: French medieval history
- Notable works: Recueil des actes de Jean IV, duc de Bretagne

Michael Christopher Emlyn Jones (born 5 December 1940) is a British historian.

He was born in Wrexham, Wales. He studied history at Oxford, and taught in Exeter, then Nottingham from 1967 to 2002, specialising in French medieval history.

He is a member of British and Breton historical societies, including the Royal Historical Society (1971), la Société d'Histoire et d'Archéologie de Bretagne (1972), Society of Antiquaries of London (1977), Société d'Etudes et de Recherches sur le Pays de Retz (1985), Society for the Study of French History. He is a member of the Breton L'Ordre de l'Hermine and Correspondant de l'Institut. He is also a fellow of the Norwegian Academy of Science and Letters.

Most of his works are about the ducal period of Brittany, and since his retirement he has also taken an interest in the local history of Nottinghamshire, especially that relating to Southwell Minster.

In 2023, volume 67 of the journal Nottingham Medieval Studies was published as a Festschrift in Jones's honour. Its theme was "Centres and peripheries in medieval Britain and France", and it included a bibliography of Jones's publications.

== Publications ==
- Ducal Brittany 1364-1399: Relations with England and France during the Reign of Duke John IV, Oxford, Clarendon Press 1970, reprinted Sandpiper 1997
- The Creation of Brittany: A Late Medieval State, London, Hambledon 1988
- The Bretons (with Patrick Galliou), Oxford, Blackwell 1991
- Between France and England: Politics, Power and Society in Late Medieval Brittany, Ashgate 2003
- Letters, Orders and Musters of Bertrand du Guesclin, 1357–1380, Boydell 2004

=== In French ===
- Recueil des actes de Jean IV, duc de Bretagne, (3 vols) 1980–2001
- La Bretagne ducale. Jean IV de Montfort (1364–1399) entre la France et l'Angleterre, 1998
- Les châteaux de Bretagne, Ouest-France, with Gwyn Meirion-Jones, Rennes, 1992
- Les Anciens Bretons des origines au XVe siècle, with Patrick Galliou, 1993
- Catalogue sommaire des archives du Fonds Lebreton, Abbaye Saint-Guénolé, Landevennec, Nottingham, 1998.
- Recueil des actes de Charles de Blois et Jeanne de Penthièvre, duc et duchesse de Bretagne (1341–1364) suivi des Actes de Jeanne de Penthièvre (1364–1384), Rennes, Presses Universitaires de Rennes 1996
- Le Premier Inventaire du Trésor des Chartes des ducs de Bretagne (1395). Hervé Le Grant et les origines du Chronicon Briocense, Soc. Histoire et d'Archeologie de Bretagne 2007
- Comptes du duché de Bretagne. Les comptes, inventaires et execution des testaments ducaux, 1262–1352, Rennes, 2017, with Philippe Charon
