= Safe conduct =

Grant allowing an enemy to traverse one's territory

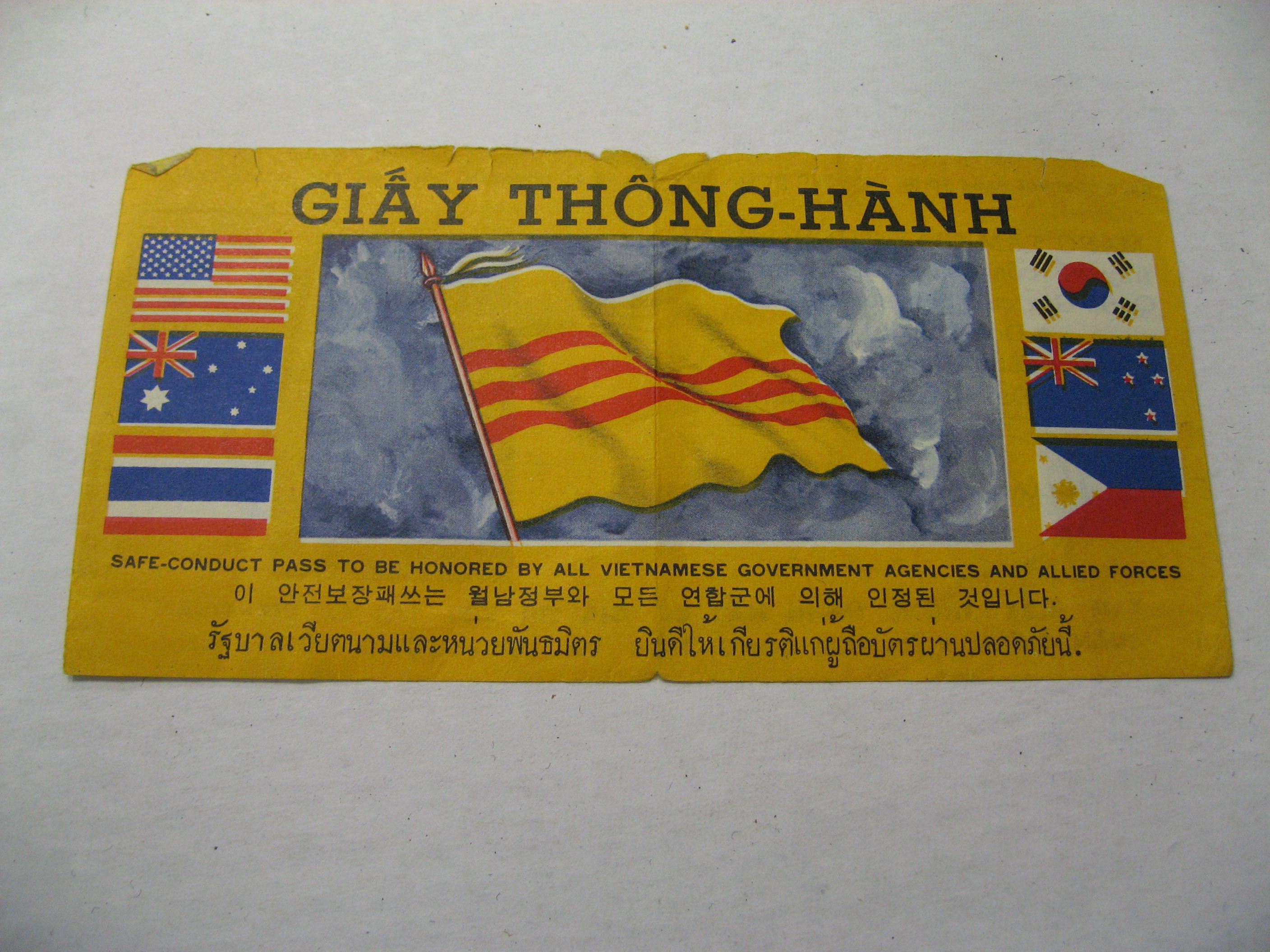
Safe conduct pass, issued by American forces and air dropped in Vietnam to encourage defection of North Vietnamese and Viet Cong forces.

Safe conduct, safe passage, or letters of transit, is the situation in time of international conflict or war where one state, a party to such conflict, issues to a person (usually, an enemy state's subject) a pass or document to allow the enemy alien to traverse its territory without harassment, bodily harm, or fear of death.

== Description ==
Safe conduct — a term used both for the promise of security and the document authorizing it — is only granted in exceptional circumstances. It may be given to an enemy to allow retreat under surrender terms, or for a meeting to negotiate; to a stateless person; or to somebody who for some reason would normally not be able to pass. A vanquished enemy can also be given, or offered, quarter, i.e., be spared, be promised or guaranteed mercy.

In Islamic law, safe conduct or pledge of safety (amān) can be granted to foreigners or dhimmi residents (musta'min) while they travel or reside in Islamic-ruled lands.

In the early Middle Ages, during some periods of Islamic control of the Holy Land, Christian pilgrims could request letters of safe conduct from a Muslim ruler, allowing them to pass through their lands to Jerusalem.

An example of safe conduct in the West is William Wallace's 13th-century possession of letters of safe conduct, which were granted to him and his army by a number of parties during the Wars of Scottish Independence.

A 20th-century example of safe conduct was Vladimir Lenin's 1917 "sealed train" from Switzerland to Russia through Germany during World War I: A citizen of Russia, then at war with Germany, in exile in Switzerland, Lenin was permitted to transit Germany without stopping, as it was Germany's hope that he would destabilize its adversary.

Another example would be the Chieu Hoi program, during the Vietnam War.
