= War of the Breton Succession, 1341–1343 =

First phase of the Breton Civil War

First phase of the Breton Civil War
- Part of the Breton Civil War and the Hundred Years' War
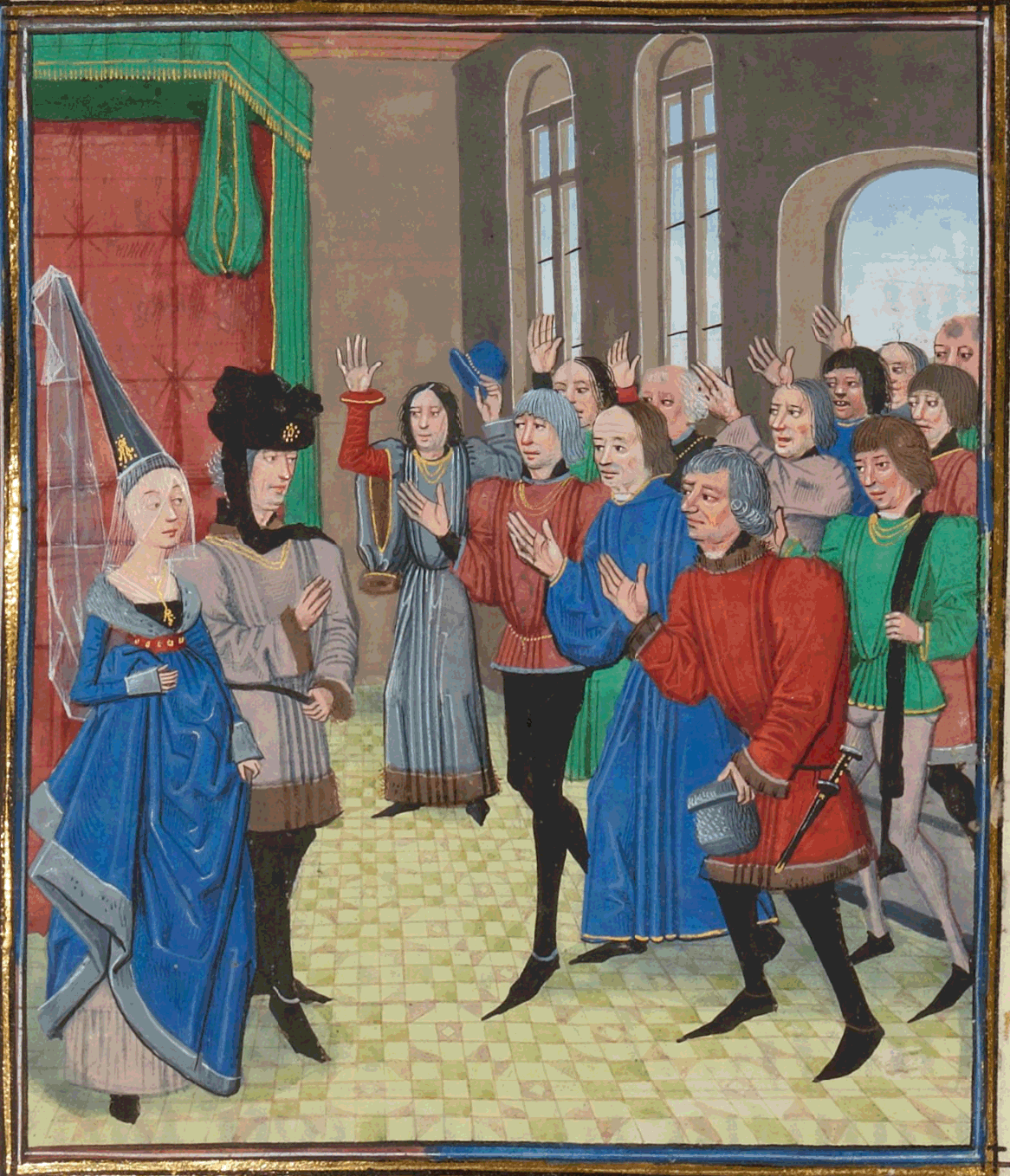
- Citizens of Nantes paying homage to John and Joanna of Montfort
Date	May 1341 – 19 January 1343
Location	Duchy of Brittany
Result	Inconclusive (Truce of Malestroit)

Belligerents
• France; • House of Blois	• England; • House of Montfort

Commanders and leaders
• Charles of Blois; • John, Duke of Normandy	• John of Montfort; • Joanna of Montfort; • William, Earl of Northampton; • Edward III

The Breton Civil War was a dynastic dispute between two claimants to the Duchy of Brittany which broke out in May 1341, after the death of Duke John III. A complicating factor was the ongoing Hundred Years' War between France and England. Philip VI of France supported the claim to the duchy of his nephew, Charles of Blois; Edward III of England backed the rival claimant, John of Montfort. John seized most of the fortified places in Brittany in 1341, but a French army sent to support Charles overran eastern Brittany and captured John in November. John's wife, Joanna of Montfort, took command of her husband's field army, set up her two-year-old son, also named John, as the faction's figurehead and heir to his father's claim to the duchy, and appealed for English military intervention. A truce between France and England was in place, but it was due to expire in June 1342.

In late May 1342 Charles led an army against the small but strongly walled port of Hennebont where Joanna was based. Repeated assaults were rebuffed, but the delayed arrival of English reinforcements – caused by lack of shipping and bad weather – forced the Montfortists to retreat to the extreme west of Brittany. The English arrived in August, relieved Brest – where Charles was again besieging Joanna – and inflicted a heavy defeat on Charles at the battle of Morlaix, the first land battle of the Hundred Years' War. Edward III arrived with further English reinforcements, besieged Vannes, and in turn overran most of Brittany. Attempts to reinforce or supply Edward from England failed and a French army greatly outnumbering the Anglo-Montfortist force was raised and advanced to Malestroit, 18 miles (29 km) from the English camp. Philip entered into negotiations with Edward and the Truce of Malestroit, which was supposed to pause hostilities for three-and-a-half years, was agreed on 19 January 1343.

A peace conference was arranged in Avignon where, mediated by Pope Clement VI, a treaty to permanently end the war was to be drafted. The conference did not convene until late 1344, due to English quibbling over the arrangements. The proposals made by each side were unacceptable to the other. Neither displayed any willingness to compromise, and the conference rapidly collapsed. After mutual provocations Edward formally renounced the truce on 15 June 1345 and full-scale war resumed. Despite the truce, the Breton Civil War had been grinding on as a disjointed and inconclusive series of petty sieges and skirmishes. The English and their Montfortist allies held almost the whole of Brittany by 1345. The Breton Civil War continued until 1365, the Hundred Years' War until 1453.

== Background ==
France in 1328: English-controlled Gascony is shown in blue in the south west

Since the Norman Conquest of 1066, English monarchs had held titles and lands within France, the possession of which made them vassals of the kings of France. By the first quarter of the fourteenth century, the only sizeable French possession still held by the English in France was Gascony in the south west. Following a series of disagreements between Philip VI of France and Edward III of England, on 24 May 1337 Philip's Great Council agreed that the lands held by Edward III in France should be taken back into Philip's hands on the grounds that Edward was in breach of his obligations as a vassal. This marked the start of the Hundred Years' War, which was to last 116 years.

On 26 January 1340 Edward formally claimed the French throne. The immediate effect was to allow the Flemings to join his cause without technically disowning their fealty to the French crown and therefore becoming rebels. The extent to which Edward considered the claim more than a negotiating position is unclear. In June the French navy was annihilated by the English fleet at the battle of Sluys and in July Edward invaded north-east France at the head of a large, heavily subsidised, allied army. The allies laid siege to Tournai on 1 August. On 7 September the French army arrived, but Philip held it back to ensure there was no risk of a battle occurring. He was probably aware that the allied army was falling apart, with the English unable to pay their allies what they had been promised, or even to feed them. Negotiations for a pause in the fighting were opened, mediated by emissaries of Pope Benedict XII. The Truce of Espléchin was rapidly agreed, to last from 25 September 1340 to 24 June 1341. The allied armies left France thereafter. The English Crown, bankrupt, was unable to meet its commitments, and Edward fled the continent to avoid his creditors.

== Civil war in Brittany ==
Brittany was a province of France, but although the dukes of Brittany were vassals of the French kings they governed the duchy as independent rulers. Nevertheless, when the Hundred Years' War broke out in 1337 between France and England the duke of Brittany, John III (r. 1312–1341), fought alongside his feudal lord the king of France. John III died on 30 April 1341, leaving a disputed succession, with both his niece, Joan of Penthièvre, and his younger half-brother, John of Montfort, claiming the duchy. Joan's claim was exercised through her husband, Charles of Blois, a well-connected and militarily oriented French nobleman who was also a nephew of King Philip of France.

On John III's death John of Montfort acted quickly and installed friendly garrisons in most of the towns and castles of Brittany by August. The Parlement of Paris was the supreme judicial authority in France and on 7 September, at Philip's urging, it declared that Charles of Blois was the legitimate successor to John III. Philip found the idea of having a relative as the duke attractive because it would bring the traditionally semi-autonomous province more firmly under royal control. He was willing to commit considerable military resources to achieve this and despatched an army, commanded by his eldest son, John, Duke of Normandy, to support Charles.

This army overran all of eastern Brittany except Rennes and took John of Montfort prisoner. (Note: John surrendered on the granting of a safe conduct to Paris and back by John, Duke of Normandy, King Philip's oldest son, who escorted him. He was released in 1343 on condition he gave up the struggle. He stayed away from Brittany until his death in 1345.) John's wife, Joanna of Montfort, was in Rennes when news of John's capture arrived. She acted decisively, recalled the field army from western Brittany, took command and moved to Hennebont, a small but strongly walled town with access to the sea. From there Joanna retained control of most of western Brittany and set up her two-year-old son, also named John, as the faction's figurehead and heir to his father's claim to the duchy. She despatched her senior counsellor, Amaury of Clisson, to Edward III, the English king, with the ducal treasury to encourage English military intervention and waited on events.

On 21 February 1342 Edward sealed a treaty to support the Montfort cause as an extension of the war with France. Edward saw the opportunity to set up a ruler in Brittany at least partly under his control; this could provide access to Breton ports which would greatly aid England's naval war and give ready entry to France for English armies. In May 1342 Clement VI became pope. He was strongly pro-French and had previously been one of Philip's senior advisers. He despatched two cardinals to attempt to broker a permanent settlement of the Anglo-French war. The following month they were well received by Philip in Paris; Edward, on the other hand, would not even allow them to cross the Channel.

== English intervention ==
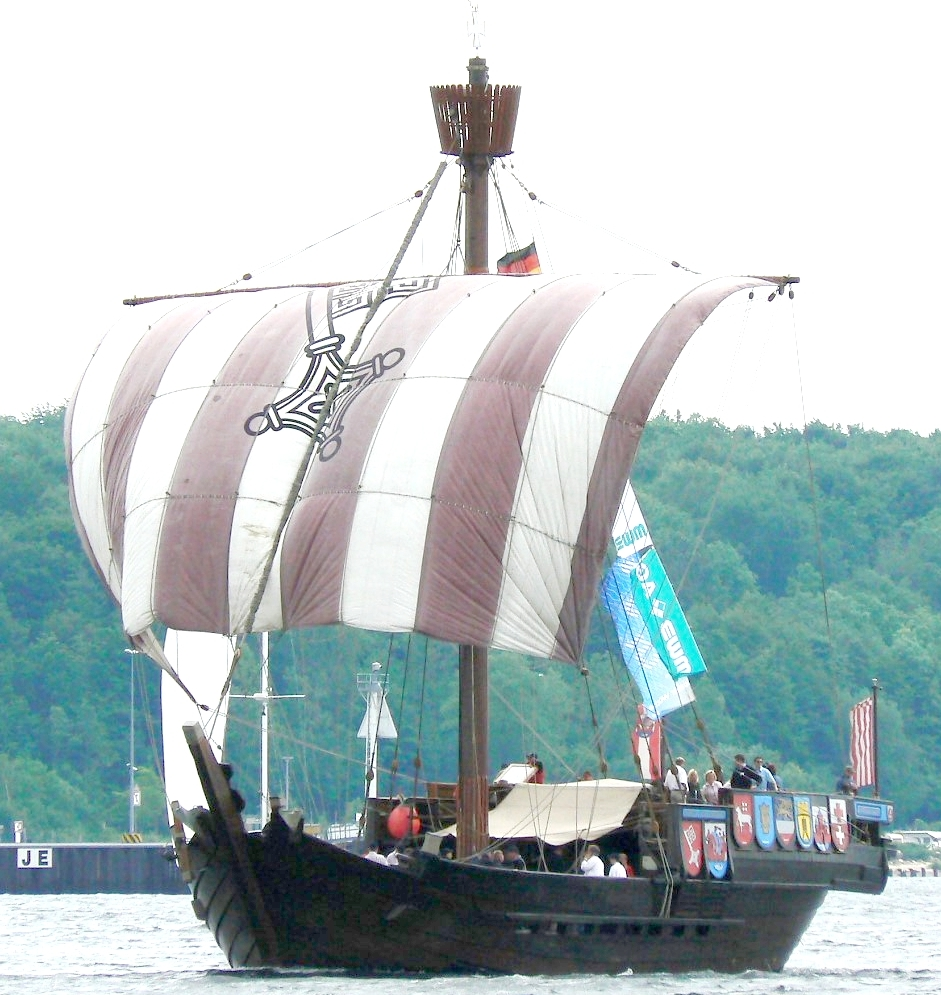
In 1962 a well-preserved wreck of a cog dated to 1380 was found near Bremen, Germany. This is a full-size reproduction. Merchant vessels such as these formed the bulk of the English fleet.

A map of Brittany, with modern administrative boundaries, showing the locations of some of the places mentioned in the text

English reinforcements took a long time to arrive and in May 1342 Rennes fell, allowing Charles to march on Hennebont, part of a general offensive to push his area of control westward. On arrival at Hennebont several units of Charles's army advanced against orders and attacked some of the town's defenders who were formed up outside its gate. More troops were pulled into this fight before the French were pushed back in a disorderly retreat. The Montfortists pursued, inflicting many casualties and burning the French camp. According to a contemporary account Joanna rode through the suburbs in full armour encouraging the fighting men. Two days later the French launched a series of better-planned assaults on the town's walls, but all were repulsed with losses. The main French force moved on, leaving a detachment to carry out a regular siege in an attempt to starve the town into surrender.

A fleet of French and mercenary galleys cruised off the north Breton coast, but there was so little English naval activity that they were beached and their crews went ashore to fight as infantry. Edward planned to land in Brittany himself in June with a substantial force, but extreme difficulty in assembling ships, (Note: By English common law, the crown was required to compensate the owners of ships impressed into service, but in practice the king paid little and late, which caused shipowners to be reluctant to answer summonses to arms.) despite draconian measures taken by Admiral Robert Morley, and then contrary winds, caused this date to be repeatedly put back.

While waiting for English reinforcements the flow of events went against the Montfortists in the face of Charles's huge military superiority. Having taken Vannes, he moved on to besiege Auray and, again, Hennebont; both fell. By August little was left of Joanna's forces, most of whom were besieged in the western port of Brest by a large army and blockaded from the sea by 14 mercenary Genoese galleys. Brest was on the brink of surrender when the English arrived on 18 August. Their fleet of 140 converted merchantmen and an unknown number of galleys took the Genoese galleys by surprise and 11 were burnt.

The English ships carried 1,350 men, a force far inferior to that of the French besieging Brest. But, seeing so many English ships crowded into the Brest Roads and the English vanguard disembarking onto the beach, they anticipated an attack by a vast host. Charles promptly broke off the siege and withdrew 65 kilometres (40 mi), abandoning western Brittany, where the populace strongly favoured the Montfort cause. Part of Charles' force withdrew along the south coast of Brittany, but the bulk of the army accompanied him to Guingamp. Here he concentrated his forces and called up local levies. The English were commanded by William, Earl of Northampton, who was reinforced by 800 men under Robert of Artois a few days after landing. He also absorbed several other small English forces and an unknown number of John of Montfort's Breton partisans. Northampton's first mission was to secure a port for the main English army to disembark at.

== English offensives ==
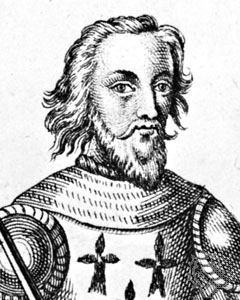
Charles of Blois as envisaged in 1621

The English marched 30 miles (50 km) from Brest to Morlaix, a port on the north coast of Brittany with strong fortifications and a secure harbour, and laid siege to it. Edward's contingent was still in England waiting for the ships which had transported Northampton's echelon to return. The French mistakenly believed this army would be used in north-east France, probably disembarking in Picardy. A French army was gathered to confront this imagined threat, including many men transferred from Brittany. Charles became aware his force greatly outnumbered the English, despite the detachments to Picardy, and took his army west in an attempt to relieve Morlaix.

Warned of this, the English carried out a night march and prepared a defensive position on the Guingamp-Morlaix road. When they sighted the English position, the French deployed into three divisions, one behind the other. The first of these, probably made up of Breton levies, advanced and was shot to pieces by the English archers using longbows; it then broke without making contact. The second division, of French and Breton men-at-arms, attacked but their charge was halted when they fell into a camouflaged ditch in front of the English position. Presented with a large, close-range target the English archers inflicted many casualties. About 200 French cavalry made their way over the ditch and came to grips with the English men-at-arms, who were fighting on foot. This band was cut off by the English and all were killed or captured.

Northampton was concerned that the English archers were running out of arrows and that the ditch was so full of dead and wounded men and horses as to be ineffective as an obstacle. Therefore, when the third French division was seen to be preparing to attack the English withdrew into a wood to their rear. The French were unable to force their way in, so they surrounded it and besieged the English, possibly for several days. Northampton broke out with a night attack and returned to Morlaix. Charles gave up his attempt to relieve the town and retreated. This was the first major land battle of the Hundred Years' War and the tactics used foreshadowed those of both the French and the English for the rest of the 1340s.

On 6 October Edward abandoned his siege train on the beach and set sail from England with those troops he was able to embark onto the available shipping. They reached Brittany after a storm-wracked three-week passage. After concentrating at Brest, the English and Montfortist force moved on the major city of Vannes, the second most populous settlement in Brittany, with a good harbour and walls. From Vannes a strong detachment could control much of southern Brittany. On 7 November both the navy and the army set off. The fleet was depleted by the desertion of most of its ships; their masters and crews were unhappy at not being paid and at being forced out to sea in dangerous winter weather. Those left sailed to Vannes, enduring a winter storm en route. They attempted to take the town with a surprise attack; this came close to success but was defeated. In England the King's Council attempted to organise a further fleet to carry supplies and reinforcements. Fifty-six ships sailed on or after 3 November carrying 600 men, but were driven ashore in the Isles of Scilly by further storms. They and 800 men who had not sailed waited for a break in the weather, fruitlessly: they were finally stood down in February 1343.

The main Anglo-Breton army marched unopposed 120 miles (190 km) through southern Brittany and on 29 November attempted to take Vannes by storm. The French garrison had been newly reinforced and repelled this assault; a regular siege began. The siege did not require the entire army and large detachments were sent on chevauchees across eastern Brittany to devastate the region and capture the fortified places. The outskirts of Dinan and the area around Dol were devastated, 100 miles (160 km) north of Vannes. Ploërmel, Malestroit and Redon were captured and Nantes, the ducal capital, was besieged. Increasing numbers of Breton knights and lords switched their allegiance to the Montfortist cause. However, there were fewer than 5,000 English troops in Brittany, and the term of service of many was running out. No food supplies were arriving for Edward by sea, and although he sent out foraging columns over a broad area, living off the land in winter yielded thin returns. Edward's army was in difficulty.

== Truce ==
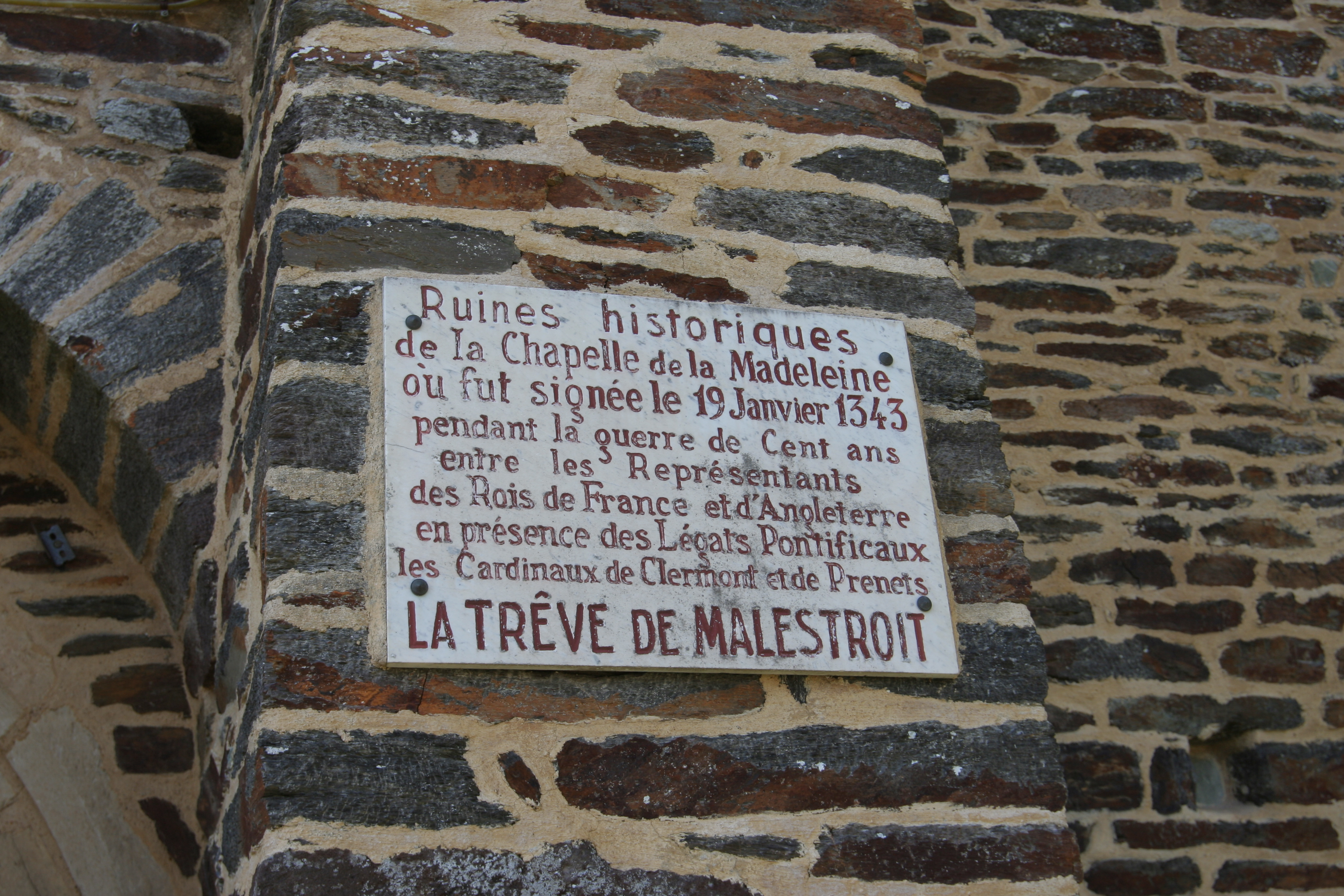
The commemorative plaque on the ruins of the Chapel of the Madeleine where the truce was sealed, reads: "Historic ruins of the Magdalene chapel, where was signed on 19th January 1343 during the Hundred Years' war by representatives of the English and French realms, the Truce of Malestroit, in the presence of Papal legates the Cardinals of Clermont and Prenets." (Note: The representatives were actually Annibaldo Caetani, Bishop of Frascati–Tusculum, and Pierre Desprès, Bishop of Palestrina–Praeneste. Prenets appears to be a misspelling; the Bishop of Clermont at the time was Étienne Aubert (later Pope Innocent VI), who was not at Malestroit.)

The French were perturbed by Edward's landing in Brittany, when he was expected to invade further east, and by his taking the field so late in the season, when their armies had been disbanded. During November they struggled to put together an army and to accumulate sufficient supplies to feed and equip it. The army was based at the major French supply centre of Angers with John, Duke of Normandy, again in command. There are no contemporary figures on the size of the French army, but it was several times larger than the Anglo-Breton force. It was 14 December before the French began the 50-mile (80 km) journey west to the Breton border. Edward was sufficiently alarmed to invite the two cardinals he had brushed off in the summer to present their credentials. They had been observing events from Avranches, just over the Breton border, and were allowed no closer than Malestroit, 18 miles (29 km) from the main English camp. Edward suspected that details of everything they saw would be passed on to the French and took great care not to betray the small size and poor state of his army.

Once started, the French advance was rapid; it was Christmas Day (25 December) 1342 when the French relieved Nantes. Redon, Ploërmel and Malestroit were recaptured during early January and the French encamped around the latter. The two cardinals were probably in Malestroit when it fell to the French, on or shortly after 10 January. As in 1340 the French were content to threaten the English, without moving close enough for serious fighting to be a possibility. With both sides disinclined to commit to battle, negotiations were entered into. Philip VI set up his court at Redon from where he sent emissaries to the cardinals. By 19 January 1343 the terms of a truce had been agreed and it was sealed; the break in hostilities was to last until 29 September 1346.

The historian Jonathan Sumption describes the terms as "astonishingly favourable" to the English. Both France and England were to retain the territory they held when the truce came into effect: this applied to Brittany, Gascony, Flanders and Scotland. Vannes was to be held by the papacy for the duration of the truce, Philip was to immediately free John of Montfort and there was a general exchange of prisoners. Both monarchs pledged to negotiate a treaty to permanently end the war, in Avignon, then the seat of the Papacy; with the process to be mediated by Clement. In reality each saw the truce as a mere pause and neither intended to negotiate in good faith; the truce had only been agreed because each king felt it was beneficial to him.

== Aftermath ==
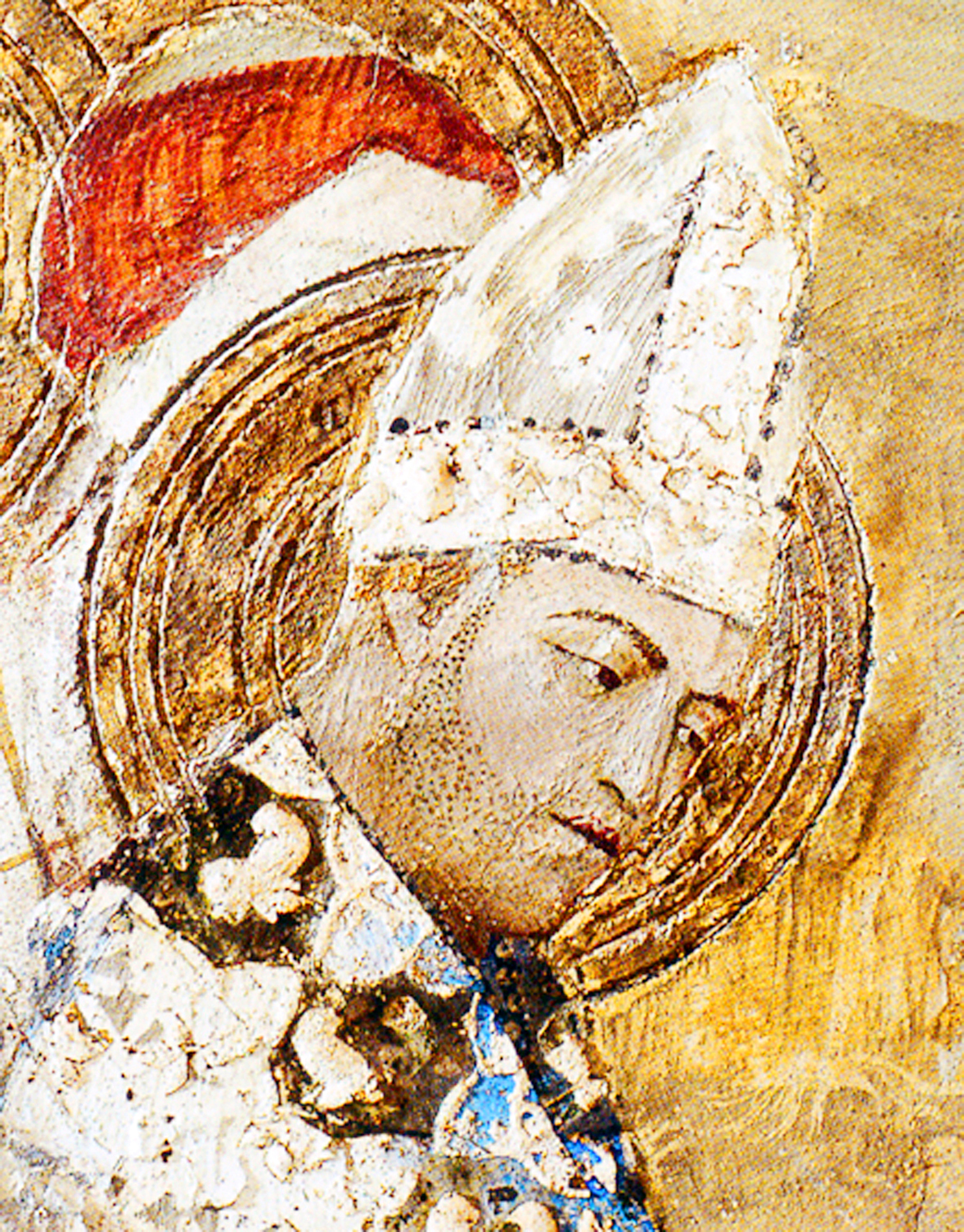
Pope Clement VI, pictured on the wall of the Chapel of Saint-Martial in the Papal Palace in Avignon. Clement commissioned the decoration of the chapel, which was completed during his lifetime.

Edward left for England, enduring another winter storm which scattered the fleet, sinking several ships, He arrived on 1 March. Philip believed that with the fighting ended, all the English would leave for home, as they had left north-east France after the Truce of Espléchin. He was mistaken, and the Breton Civil War ground on in a series of petty skirmishes, despite the truce. The English and their Montfortist allies held almost the whole of Brittany by 1345. John of Montfort was not released until September, despite the treaty's stipulations. Late in 1343 the citizens of Vannes rose against the Pope's authority, expelled his garrison and delivered the town to the English, who held it until the end of the Breton Civil War in 1364.

The English did not trust Clement and repeatedly delayed sending delegates to the envisaged peace talks. When the conference finally convened in late 1344 the proposals made by each side were unacceptable to the other, with neither displaying any willingness to compromise, and it rapidly collapsed. Neither monarch took the provisions of the truce agreement seriously; the fighting had continued much as before in Brittany and Gascony. Edward was planning another major invasion of France long before the truce was due to expire in September 1346. During the summer of 1343 Olivier of Clisson, a senior Breton lord, was invited from England to a tournament on French soil. As he was protected by the treaty he attended, but on the orders of the French king was arrested for treason and executed without trial. Edward formally renounced the truce on 15 June 1345, at which Gascony reverted to full-scale war.

Edward personally led another expedition to France in 1346, this time landing in Normandy. His army was wholly English and Welsh and it laid waste to a 40-mile-wide (64 km) strip of some of the richest lands in France to within 2 miles (3 km) of Paris, sacking many towns on the way. On 26 August 1346 Philip was finally provoked into attacking at the battle of Crécy, where the French were defeated with a heavy loss of life. In the aftermath of this battle the English laid siege to the port of Calais, which fell in August 1347. The Truce of Calais was subsequently sealed on 28 September; originally due to expire on 7 July 1348, it was repeatedly extended until 1355, when full-scale war broke out once again.

Joanna of Montfort travelled to England in 1343 and took no further part in the war, dying in September 1374. She stayed in Tickhill Castle and it was given out at the time that she had gone insane; this is accepted by most historians although it has been suggested that she was confined for political reasons, rather than because of mental illness. John of Montfort died in 1345, but the Breton Civil War continued as a disjointed and inconclusive sequence of sieges, skirmishes and truces, frequently as part of the Hundred Years' War. The eastern and southern parts of Brittany were mostly held by the French, who continued to strongly support Charles of Blois, while western and northern Brittany continued to be largely Montfort or English controlled. Charles of Blois was killed in 1364 at the Battle of Auray and his army decisively defeated. The next year his widow, Joan of Penthièvre, signed the Treaty of Guérande, recognising John of Montfort's son as Duke of Brittany, which ended the war. The Hundred Years' War continued until 1453, when it ended in a French victory.

== Notes, citations and sources ==
=== Sources ===
- Allmand, Christopher (2001). The Hundred Years' War: England and France at War, c. 1300–c. 1450. Cambridge: Cambridge University Press. ISBN 978-0-521-31923-2.
- Bennett, Matthew (1999). "The Development of Battle Tactics in the Hundred Years War". In Curry, Anne; Hughes, Michael (eds.). Arms, Armies and Fortifications in the Hundred Years War. Woodbridge, Suffolk: Boydell & Brewer. pp. 1–20. ISBN 978-0-85115-755-9.
- Bárány, Attila (1997). "The Participation of the English Aristocracy in the First Phase of the Hundred Years War". Hungarian Journal of English and American Studies. 3 (2): 211–240. JSTOR 41273967.
- Bordonove, Georges (2006). Charles VI: Le roi fol et bien-aimé. Les Rois qui ont fait la France (in French). Paris: Pygmalion. ISBN 978-2-7564-0018-1.
- Bove, Boris; Biget, Jean-Louis (2013). Le Temps de la Guerre de Cent Ans: 1328–1453 (in French). Vol. 1. Paris: Belin. ISBN 978-2-7011-3361-4.
- "Charles, Duke of Brittany". Britannica. Encyclopædia Britannica. 2025.
- Burne, Alfred (1999) [1955]. The Crécy War. Ware, Hertfordshire: Wordsworth Editions. ISBN 978-1-84022-210-4.
- Curry, Anne (2002). The Hundred Years' War 1337–1453. Essential Histories. Oxford: Osprey Publishing. ISBN 978-1-84176-269-2.
- Cushway, Graham (2011). Edward III and the War at Sea: The English Navy, 1327–1377. Woodbridge, Suffolk: Boydell Press. ISBN 978-1-84383-621-6.
- Déprez, Eugène (1967). "La Conference Avignon (1344)". In Little, A. G. & Powicke, F. M. (eds.). Essays in Medieval History Presented to Thomas Frederick Tout (in French). Freeport, New York: Books for Libraries Press. pp. 301–320. ISBN 978-0-8369-0427-7.
- DeVries, Kelly (1998) [1996]. Infantry Warfare in the Early Fourteenth Century. Woodbridge, Suffolk: Boydell Press. ISBN 978-0-85115-567-8.
- Frélaut, Bertrand (2005). Histoire de Vannes (in French). Paris: Gisser. ISBN 978-2-87747-527-3.
- Graham-Goering, Erika (2020). Princely Power in Late Medieval France: Jeanne de Penthièvre and the War for Brittany. Cambridge: Cambridge University Press. ISBN 978-1-108-80554-4.
- Hoskins, Peter (2011). In the Steps of the Black Prince: The Road to Poitiers, 1355–1356. Woodbridge, Suffolk: Boydell. ISBN 978-1-84383-611-7.
- Jones, Michael (1988). The Creation of Brittany: A Late Medieval State. London: Hambledon Press. ISBN 978-0-907628-80-4.
- Jones, Michael (1999). "War and Fourteenth-Century France". In Curry, Anne; Hughes, Michael (eds.). Arms, Armies and Fortifications in the Hundred Years War. Woodbridge, Suffolk: Boydell & Brewer. pp. 103–120. ISBN 978-0-85115-755-9.
- Luyster, Amanda (2011). "Christ's Golden Voice: The Chapels of St. Martial and St. John in the Palace of the Popes, Avignon". Word & Image. 2011 (July): 334–346. doi:10.1080/02666286.2011.541119.
- Mortimer, Ian (2007). The Perfect King: The Life of Edward III, Father of the English Nation. London: Pimlico. ISBN 978-1-84413-530-1.
- Neillands, Robin (2001). The Hundred Years War. London; New York: Routledge. ISBN 978-0-415-26131-9.
- Ormrod, W. Mark (1990). Edward III. New Haven: Yale University Press. ISBN 978-0-300-11910-7. OCLC 1039705847.
- Prestwich, Michael (1980). The Three Edwards: War and State in England 1272–1377. London: Book Club Associates. ISBN 978-0-297-77730-4.
- Rodger, N. A. M. (2004). The Safeguard of the Sea: A Naval History of Britain. 660–1649. Vol. I. London: Penguin. ISBN 978-0-14-029724-9.
- Rogers, Clifford (1998). "An Unknown News Bulletin from the Siege of Tournai in 1340". War in History. 5 (3): 358–366. doi:10.1177/096834459800500305. JSTOR 26007300.
- Rogers, Clifford (2014). War Cruel and Sharp: English Strategy under Edward III, 1327–1360. Woodbridge, Suffolk: Boydell Press. ISBN 978-0-85115-804-4. Archived from the original on 15 March 2022.
- Rose, Susan (2007). The Medieval Sea. London: Bloomsbury. ISBN 978-1-85285-563-5.
- Sadler, John (2013) [2005]. Border Fury: England and Scotland at War 1296–1568. London; New York: Routledge. ISBN 978-1-4058-4022-4.
- Sarpy, Julie (2019). Joanna of Flanders: Heroine and Exile. Stroud, Gloucestershire: Amberley Publishing. ISBN 978-1-4456-8855-8.
- Sumption, Jonathan (1990). The Hundred Years War 1: Trial by Battle. London: Faber & Faber. ISBN 978-0-571-13895-1.
- Visser, Nils & Snijder, Willeke (2014). "The Flame of Britanny: Jeanne de Flandres". Medieval Warfare. 4 (2): 33–38. JSTOR 48578335.
- Wagner, John A. (2006). Encyclopedia of the Hundred Years War. Woodbridge, Suffolk: Greenwood. ISBN 978-0-313-32736-0.
- Williamson, James Alexander (1944) [1931]. The Evolution of England: A Commentary on the Facts. Oxford: Clarendon Press. OCLC 984703073.
