= Jean Rouxel =

French solid state chemist

Jean Marcel Rouxel
- Born: February 24, 1935; Malestroit, France
- Died: March 19, 1998 (aged 63); Nantes, France
- Citizenship: French
- Education: University of Rennes; University of Bordeaux
- Known for: solid-state chemistry
- Scientific career
- Institutions: University of Bordeaux; University of Nantes; École normale supérieure de Lyon; Collège de France
- Thesis: Sur deux nouvelles familles de composés de l'aluminium: les oxyhalogénures et les thiohalogénures. (1961)
- Doctoral advisor: Paul Hagenmuller
- Notable students: Claudia Felser

Jean Marcel Rouxel (February 24, 1935 in Malestroit – March 19, 1998 in Nantes) was a French synthetic chemist known for his work in solid state synthesis of low-dimensional materials. He pioneered the use of solid precursors in soft chemistry.

== Education and career ==
Rouxel studied at the University of Rennes and the University of Bordeaux, where he received his PhD in 1961 under Paul Hagenmuller on two classes of aluminum compounds. After that he was an assistant in Bordeaux and after military service in Algeria between 1962 and 1963, he went to the newly founded laboratory for solid state chemistry (today named after him) at the University of Nantes. There he became an assistant professor in 1964 and a professor in 1968. From 1986 to 1998 he was scientific advisor at Rhône-Poulenc. In 1988 he became director of the Institute for Materials (Institut des Matériaux, which arose from the Institute for Solid State Chemistry) in Nantes, which he remained until his death in 1998. From 1991 to 1996, he was a professor at the Institut Universitaire de France. From 1994 to 1995, he was a professor at the École normale supérieure de Lyon and from 1997 until his death he was a professor of solid state chemistry at the Collège de France.

He synthesized and characterized numerous solids in low dimensions (that is, one or two dimensions) and explored the properties of one-dimensional inorganic chains, such as the phase transition to charge density waves. Another area of research was incommensurable structures in solids and the connection between chemistry and electronic band structure in solids. He studied the mechanisms of anionic polymerization in solids and the competition of anions and cations in redox reactions in solids. He is also working on a type of synthesis based on biological processes, which is called soft chemistry (chimie douce in French), after a word coined by the French chemist Jacques Livage in 1977.

== Honors and awards ==
In 1974 he received the CNRS Silver Medal and in 1997 the CNRS Gold Medal and the Prix Paul Pascal from the French Academy of Sciences. In 1992 he was awarded the Gay-Lussac Humboldt Prize. Rouxel received the Alexander von Humboldt Research Award (1993) and gave the Debye Lecture of the Cornell University section of the American Chemical Society. He was Knight of the Legion of Honor (1988, officer from 1997) and officer of the Ordre national du Mérite and commander of the Palmes académiques. In 1988 he became a member of the Académie des sciences and he was a member of the American Academy of Arts and Sciences (1992), the German National Academy of Sciences Leopoldina (1997) and the Indian Academy of Sciences.

== Personal life ==
Rouxel had two sons and three daughters with his wife Yannick. He died from ruptured aneurysm.

== Bibliography ==
- Rouxel, J. (1979), "Alkali Metal Intercalation Compounds of Transition Metal Chalcogenides: TX2, TX3 and TX4 Chalcogenides", in Lévy, F. (ed.), Intercalated Layered Materials, Dordrecht: Springer Netherlands, pp. 201–250, doi:10.1007/978-94-009-9415-7_4, ISBN 978-94-009-9417-1
- Rouxel, Jean (1980). "Structural chemistry of layered materials and their intercalates". Physica B+C. 99 (1–4): 3–11. Bibcode:1980PhyBC..99....3R. doi:10.1016/0378-4363(80)90203-X.
- Rouxel, Jean (1986). Crystal Chemistry and Properties of Materials with Quasi-One-Dimensional Structures : a Chemical and Physical Synthetic Approach. Dordrecht: Springer Netherlands. ISBN 978-94-009-4528-9. OCLC 840305616.
- Rouxel, J.; Tournoux, M.; Brec, R. (1994). Soft Chemistry Routes to New Materials. Zurich: Trans Tech Publications, Limited. ISBN 978-3-0357-0484-6. OCLC 1193132118.
- Rouxel, Jean; Schlenker, Claire (1989), "Structural, Electronic Properties and Design of Quasi-One-Dimensional Inorganic Conductors", Modern Problems in Condensed Matter Sciences, vol. 25, Elsevier, pp. 15–83, doi:10.1016/b978-0-444-87370-5.50007-3, ISBN 978-0-444-87370-5
- Rouxel, Jean (1992-07-14). "Design and Chemical Reactivity of Low-Dimensional Solids". In Bein, Thomas (ed.). Supramolecular Architecture. ACS Symposium Series. Vol. 499. Washington, DC: American Chemical Society. pp. 88–113. doi:10.1021/bk-1992-0499.ch008. ISBN 978-0-8412-2460-5.
- Rouxel, Jean (1992). "Low-dimensional solids: an interface between molecular and solid-state chemistry? The example of chainlike niobium and tantalum chalcogenides". Acc. Chem. Res. 25 (8): 328–336. doi:10.1021/ar00020a002.
- Rouxel, J (1996). "Chimie douce with solid precursors, past and present". Solid State Ionics. 84 (3–4): 141–149. doi:10.1016/0167-2738(96)00019-7.
