= Truce of Malestroit =

1343 truce between England and France

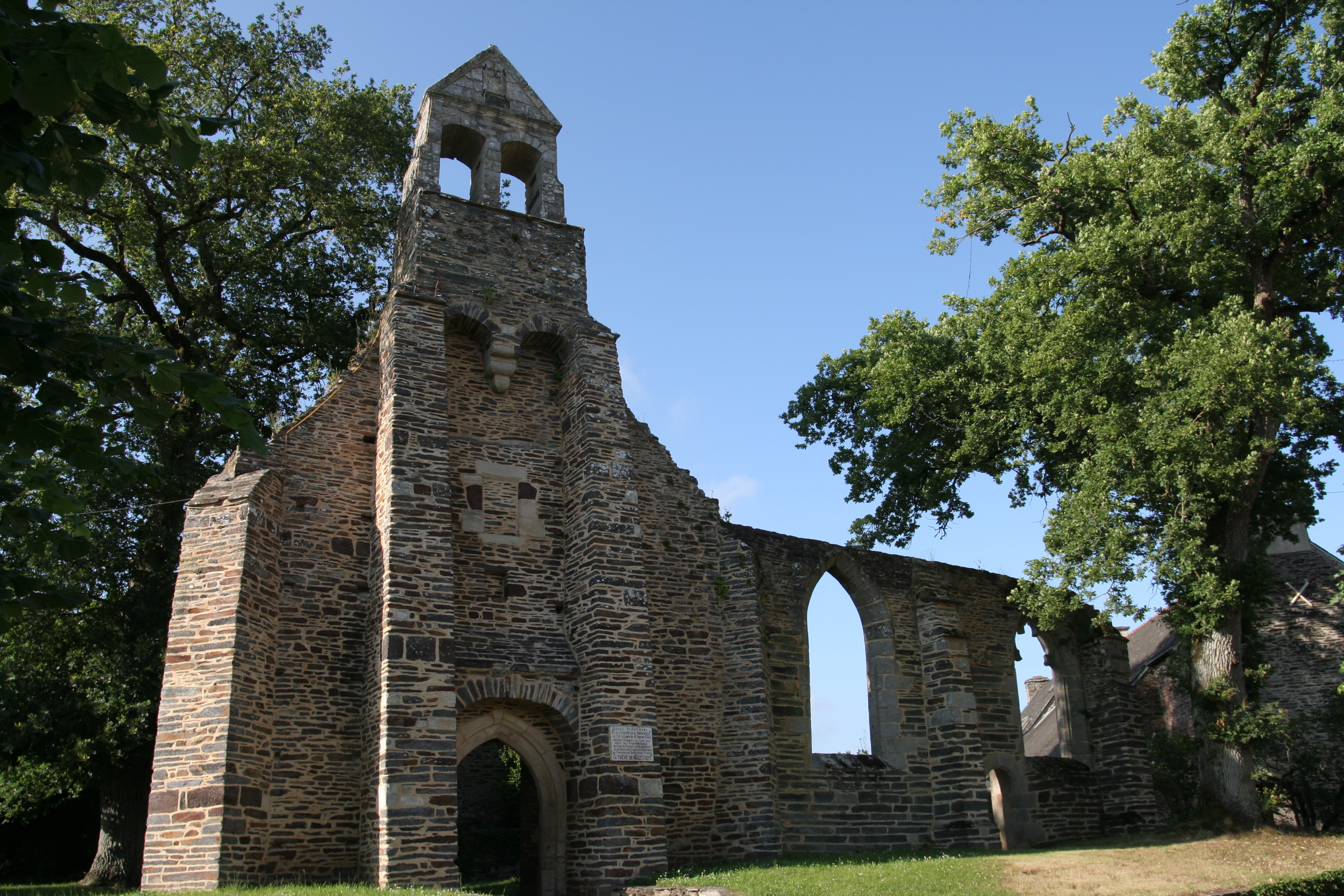
- The ruins of the Chapel of the Madeleine, Malestroit (in 2013), where the treaty was sealed
- Type: Time-limited truce
- Context: Hundred Years' War
- Drafted: January 1343
- Location: Malestroit, Brittany, France
- Sealed: 19 January 1343
- Effective: 19 January 1343
- Expiration: 29 September 1346
- Expiry: 15 June 1345, repudiated by the English
- Mediators: Cardinals Annibaldo Caetani and Pierre Desprès, on behalf of Pope Clement VI
- Original signatories: Edward III of England; Philip VI of France
- Parties: Kingdom of England; Kingdom of France

The Truce of Malestroit was sealed by King Edward III of England and King Philip VI of France on 19 January 1343 in Malestroit, Brittany, with the intention of pausing the Hundred Years' War until 29 September 1346. It laid down that a peace conference was to be held in the interim to negotiate an end to the war.

The war had broken out in 1337 and Edward had formally laid claim to the French crown in 1340, possibly as a diplomatic manoeuvre. On 25 September 1340 the Truce of Espléchin, which was mediated by emissaries of Pope Benedict XII, was agreed. This was intended to pause hostilities until 24 June 1341 but was later extended to 24 June 1342. During 1341 a succession war broke out in the Duchy of Brittany, a semi-autonomous province of France. Philip VI backed one of the factions – led by Charles of Blois – and early in 1342 Edward III backed the other – led by John of Montfort. Edward landed in Brittany in October 1342 with a small army; a lack of shipping prevented many of the available English troops from crossing the Channel with him. This English force struck at the important town of Vannes. A naval attack in November failed to take the town, and an assault by the main English army later in the month was also beaten off. The French raised a much larger army and marched it into Brittany, but halted at Malestroit, 20 miles (32 km) from Vannes.

There two cardinals mediated a truce in the course of a few days. This was sealed on 9 January 1343 and was due to last until 29 September 1346. Both monarchs pledged to send delegations to negotiate in Avignon, then the seat of the Papacy. There, mediated by Pope Clement VI, a treaty to permanently end the war would be drafted. In reality each king saw the truce as a mere pause and neither intended to negotiate in good faith; the truce had only been agreed because each felt it was beneficial to him. When the conference finally convened in late 1344 the proposals made by each side were unacceptable to the other, with neither displaying any willingness to compromise, and it rapidly collapsed. After mutual provocations Edward formally renounced the truce on 15 June 1345 and full-scale war resumed.

== Background ==
France in 1328: English-controlled Gascony is shown in blue in the south west

Since the Norman Conquest of 1066, English monarchs had held titles and lands within France, the possession of which made them vassals of the kings of France. By the first quarter of the fourteenth century, the only sizeable French possession still held by the English in France was Gascony in the south west. Following a series of disagreements between Philip VI of France and Edward III of England, on 24 May 1337 Philip's Great Council agreed that the lands held by Edward III in France should be taken back into Philip's hands on the grounds that Edward was in breach of his obligations as a vassal. This marked the start of the Hundred Years' War, which was to last 116 years.

On 26 January 1340 Edward formally claimed the French throne. The immediate effect was to allow the Flemings to join his cause without technically disowning their fealty to the French crown and therefore becoming rebels. The extent to which Edward considered the claim more than a negotiating position is unclear. In June the French navy was annihilated by the English fleet at the battle of Sluys and in July Edward invaded France at the head of a large, heavily subsidised, allied army. The allies laid siege to Tournai on 1 August. On 7 September the French army arrived, but Philip held it back to ensure there was no risk of a battle occurring. He was probably aware that the allied army was falling apart, with the English unable to pay their allies what they had been promised, or even to feed them. Negotiations for a pause in the fighting were opened, mediated by emissaries of Pope Benedict XII. The Truce of Espléchin was rapidly agreed, to last from 25 September 1340 to 24 June 1341. The allied armies left France thereafter. Edward was unable to meet his commitments, the English Crown was bankrupt, and Edward fled the continent in order to avoid his creditors.

== Breton Civil War ==
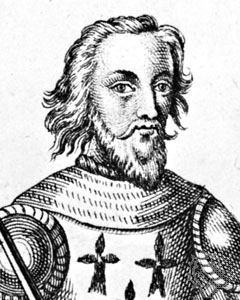
Charles of Blois as envisaged in 1621

During the early 14th century Brittany was a province of France, but while the dukes of Brittany were vassals of the French kings they governed the duchy as independent rulers. When the Duke of Brittany, John III, died on 30 April 1341 he left a disputed succession, with both his niece, Joan of Penthièvre, and his younger half-brother, John of Montfort, claiming the dukedom; Joan was married to Charles of Blois, a nephew of the King of France. The French king correctly suspected that John was negotiating with the English, and had Charles declared the rightful heir on 7 September, despatching an army to support him.

On 12 September 1341 the Truce of Espléchin was extended to 24 June 1342. Edward and his council agreed that the English army would be disbanded for the winter and the fleet paid off. Meanwhile, the French army swiftly overran all of eastern Brittany apart from Rennes and captured John. John's wife, Joanna of Montfort, fled west with the ducal treasury and their two-year-old son, also named John, whom she set up as the faction's figurehead and heir to his father's claim to the duchy. She despatched a senior counsellor to England with a large sum in cash, to encourage rapid English military intervention.

=== English intervention ===
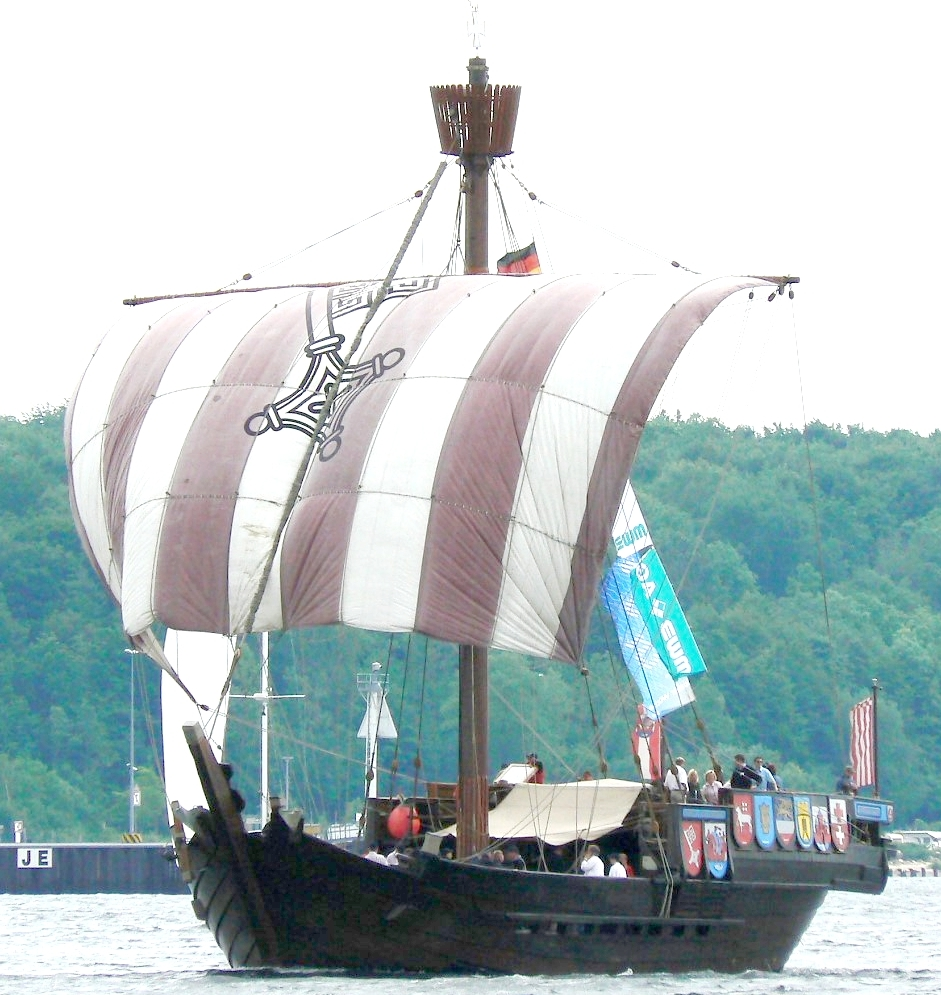
In 1962 a well-preserved wreck of a cog dated to 1380 was found near Bremen, Germany. This is a full-size reproduction. Merchant vessels such as these formed the bulk of the English fleet.

On 21 February 1342 Edward sealed a treaty to support the Montfort cause, as an extension of the war with France. Edward planned to land in Brittany himself with a substantial force, after the expiry of the Truce of Espléchin in June, but had extreme difficulty in mustering ships. (Note: Edward asserted the feudal right to the Crown to impress English merchant ships into service. He was required to compensate the owners, but in practice the King paid little and late, which caused shipowners to be reluctant to answer summonses to arms.) Eventually the English impressed 440 ships, but then contrary winds caused their departure to be repeatedly put back.

In May 1342 Clement VI became pope. He was strongly pro-French and had previously been one of Philip's senior advisers. He despatched two cardinals – Annibaldo Caetani, bishop of Frascati–Tusculum; and Pierre Desprès, bishop of Palestrina–Praeneste – to attempt to broker a permanent settlement of the Anglo-French war. They were well received by Philip in June, but Edward would not even allow them to cross the Channel. Instead he continued to gather ships and troops.

Meanwhile, the flow of events went against the Montfortists in the face of the huge military superiority of the French. By July Joanna was besieged in the port of Brest, the only fortified place still held by her faction. This was on the brink of surrender when the English advance force, commanded by William, Earl of Northampton, arrived on 18 August. The French commander, Charles of Blois, promptly broke off the siege, abandoned western Brittany and withdrew 70 miles (110 km) to Guingamp. (Note: Brest remained in English hands for 30 years; as the Hundred Years' War continued it was used to support forces guarding the passage of English ships to and from Gascony and to facilitate descents on the French-held parts of Brittany.)

The English marched 30 miles (50 km) from Brest to Morlaix, a port on the north coast of Brittany with strong fortifications and a secure harbour, and laid siege to it. Edward's contingent was still in England waiting for the ships which had transported Northampton's echelon to return. The French mistakenly believed Edward's army would be used in northern France, probably disembarking in Picardy. A French army was gathered to confront this imagined threat, including many men transferred from Brittany. Charles became aware his force greatly outnumbered the English, despite the detachments to Picardy, and took his army west in an attempt to relieve Morlaix. He was defeated by Northampton on 30 September, suffering heavy losses. (Note: Morlaix was the first major land battle of both the Breton Civil War and the Hundred Years' War.) On 6 October Edward abandoned his siege train on the beach and set sail with those troops he was able to embark onto the available shipping. They reached Brittany after a storm-wracked three-week passage.

=== Vannes ===
A map of Brittany, with modern administrative boundaries, showing the locations of some of the places mentioned in the text

After concentrating at Brest, the English and Montfortist forces moved on the major city of Vannes, the second most populous settlement in Brittany, with a good harbour and strong walls. From Vannes a strong detachment could control much of southern Brittany. On 7 November both the navy and the army set off. The fleet was depleted by the desertion of most of its ships; their masters and crews were unhappy at not being paid and at being forced out to sea in dangerous winter weather. Those left sailed to Vannes, enduring a winter storm en route. They attempted to take the town with a surprise attack; this came close to success but was defeated. In England the King's Council attempted to organise a further fleet to carry supplies and reinforcements. Fifty-six ships sailed on or after 3 November carrying 600 men, but were driven ashore in the Isles of Scilly by further storms. They and 800 men who had not sailed waited for a break in the weather, fruitlessly: they were finally stood down in February 1343.

The main Anglo-Breton army marched unopposed some 120 miles (190 km) through southern Brittany and on 29 November attempted to take Vannes by storm. The French garrison had been newly reinforced and repelled this assault; a regular siege began. The siege did not require the entire army and large detachments were sent on chevauchees across eastern Brittany to devastate the region and capture the fortified places. The outskirts of Dinan and the area around Dol were devastated, 100 miles (160 km) north of Vannes. Ploërmel, Malestroit and Redon were captured and Nantes, the ducal capital, was besieged. Increasing numbers of Breton knights and lords switched their allegiance to the Montfortist cause. However, there were fewer than 5,000 English troops in Brittany, and the term of service of many was running out. No food supplies were arriving for Edward by sea, and although he sent out foraging columns over a broad area, living off the land in winter yielded thin returns. Edward's army was in difficulty.

== Truce ==
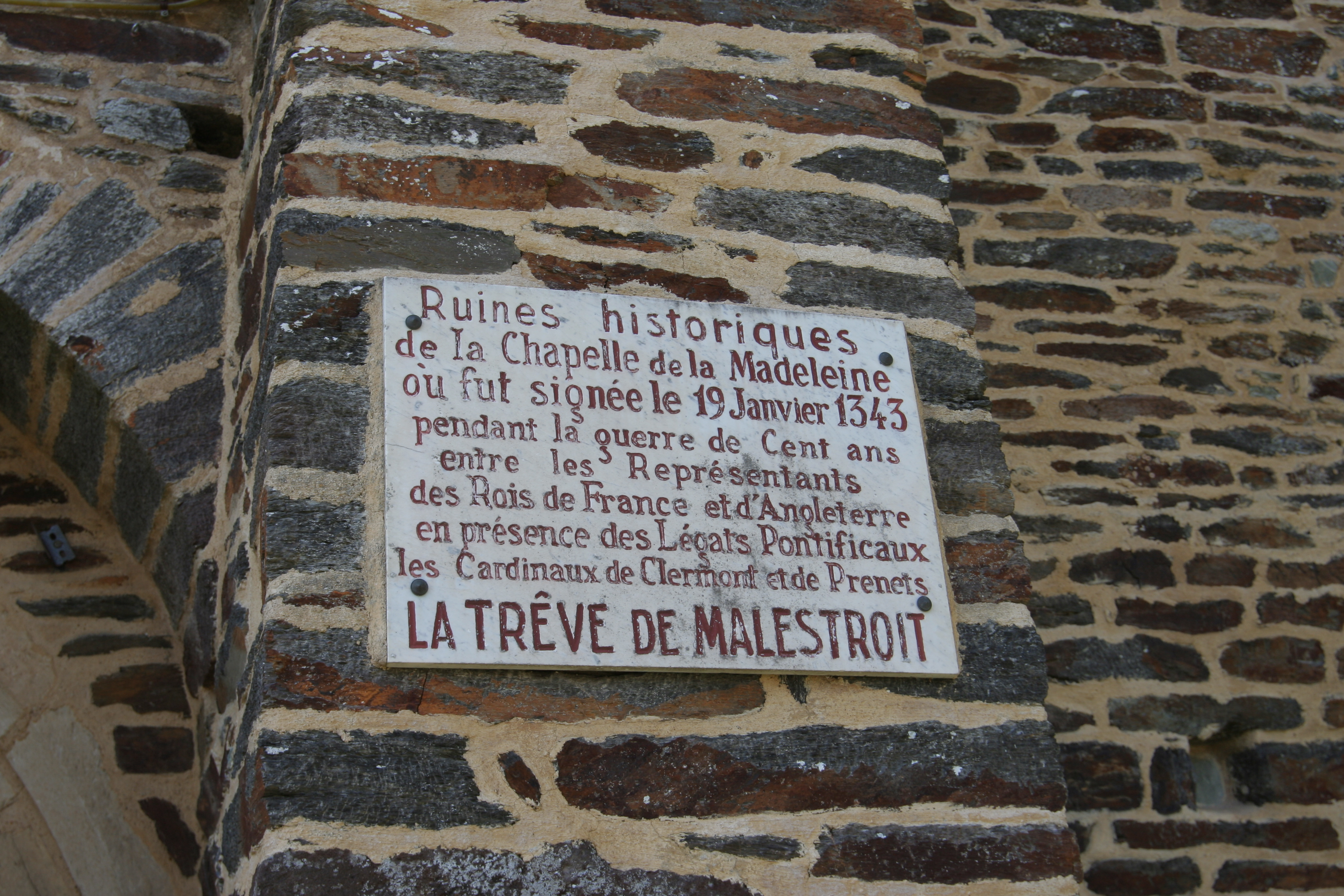
The commemorative plaque on the ruins of the Chapel of the Madeleine where the truce was sealed, reads: "Historic ruins of the Magdalene chapel, where was signed on 19th January 1343 during the Hundred Years' war by representatives of the Kings of France and England, the Truce of Malestroit, in the presence of Papal Legates the Cardinals of Clermont and Prenets." (Note: The representatives were actually Annibaldo Caetani, Bishop of Frascati–Tusculum, and Pierre Desprès, Bishop of Palestrina–Praeneste. Prenets appears to be a misspelling; the Bishop of Clermont at the time was Étienne Aubert (later Pope Innocent VI), who was not at Malestroit.)

The French were perturbed by Edward's landing in Brittany, when he was expected to invade further east, and by his taking the field so late in the season, when their armies had been disbanded. During November they struggled to put together an army and to accumulate sufficient supplies to feed and equip it. The army was based at the major French supply centre of Angers with King Philip's eldest son, John, Duke of Normandy, in command. There are no contemporary figures on the size of the French army, but it was several times larger than the Anglo-Breton force. It was 14 December before the French began the 50-mile (80 km) journey west to the Breton border. Edward was sufficiently alarmed to invite the two cardinals he had brushed off in the summer to present their credentials. They had been observing events from Avranches, just over the Breton border, and were allowed no closer than Malestroit, 18 miles (29 km) from the main English camp. Edward suspected that details of everything they saw would be passed on to the French and took great care not to betray the small size and poor state of his army.

Once started, the French advance was rapid; it was Christmas Day (25 December) 1342 when the French relieved Nantes. Redon, Ploërmel and Malestroit were recaptured during early January and the French encamped around the latter. The two cardinals were probably in Malestroit when it fell to the French, on or shortly after 10 January. As in 1340 the French were content to threaten the English, without moving close enough for serious fighting to be a possibility. With both sides disinclined to commit to battle, negotiations were entered into. Philip VI set up his court at Redon from where he sent emissaries to the cardinals. By 19 January 1343 the terms of a truce had been agreed and it was sealed; the break in hostilities was to last until 29 September 1346.

The historian Jonathan Sumption describes the terms as "astonishingly favourable" to the English. Both France and England were to retain the territory they held when the truce came into effect: this applied to Brittany, Gascony, Flanders and Scotland. Vannes was to be held by the papacy for the duration of the truce, Philip was to immediately free John of Montfort and there was a general exchange of prisoners. Both monarchs pledged to negotiate in Avignon, mediated by Clement, a treaty to permanently end the war. In reality each saw the truce as a mere pause and neither intended to negotiate in good faith; the truce had only been agreed because each king felt it was beneficial to him. Edward left for England, enduring another winter storm which scattered the fleet and sank several ships, and arrived on 1 March.

Philip believed that with the fighting ended, all the English would leave for home, as they had left north-east France after the Truce of Espléchin. He was mistaken, and the Breton Civil War ground on as a disjointed and inconclusive series of petty sieges and skirmishes, despite the truce. The English and their Montfortist allies held almost the whole of Brittany by 1345. John of Montfort was not released until September, despite the stipulation of the treaty. Late in 1343 the citizens of Vannes rose against the Pope's authority, expelled his garrison and delivered the town to the English, who held it until the end of the Breton Civil War in 1364.

=== Peace conference ===
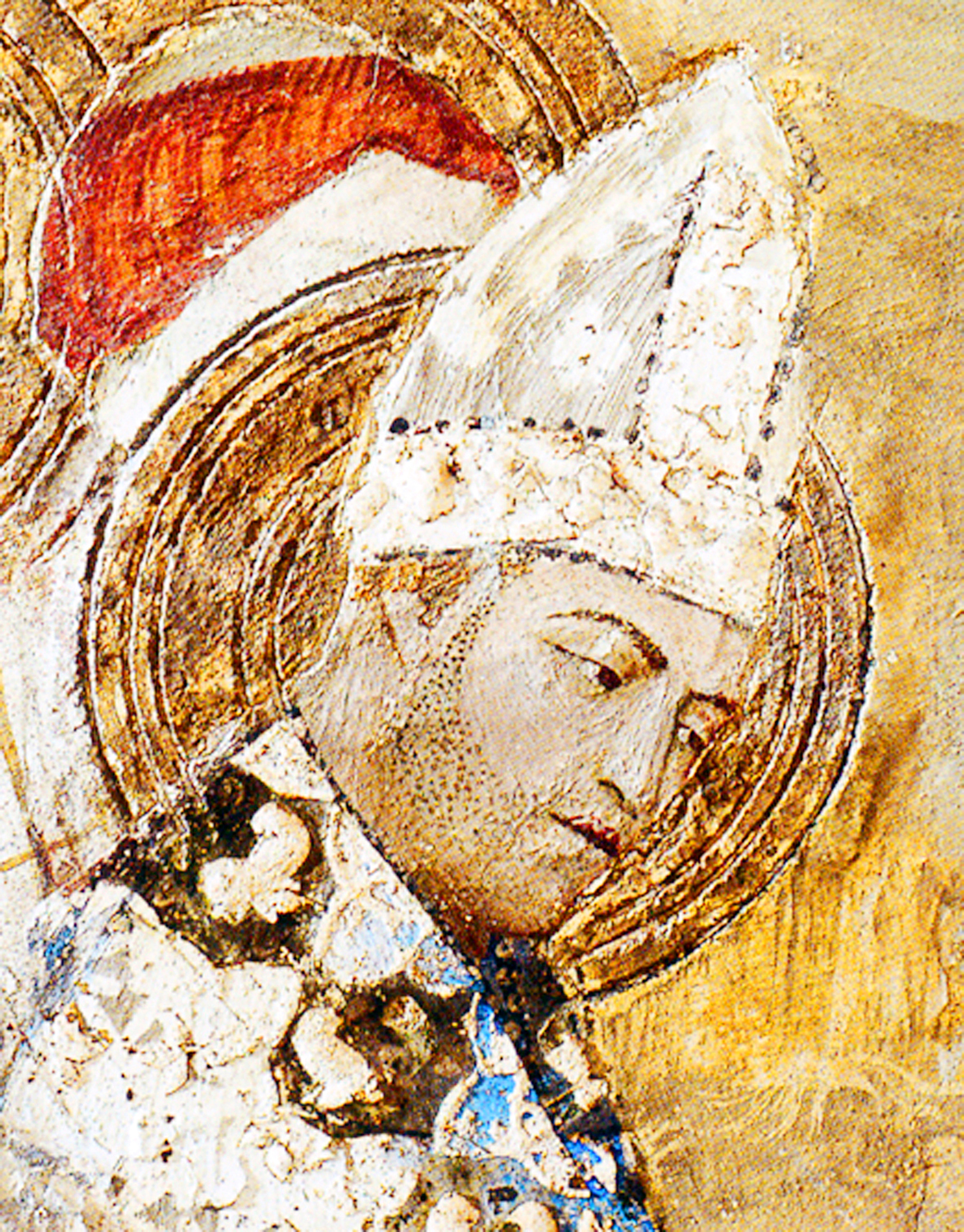
Pope Clement VI, pictured on the wall of the Chapel of Saint-Martial in the Papal Palace in Avignon. Clement commissioned the decoration of the chapel, which was completed during his lifetime.

English quibbling over the arrangements for the peace conference at Avignon delayed its start until 22 October 1344. Both the French and the English sent delegations, as they had agreed at Malestroit. The English were represented by John of Offord, Edward's lord privy seal and a seasoned diplomat; (Note: Offord became archbishop of Canterbury in 1348.) the lawyer Thomas Fastolf; William Bateman, the dean of Lincoln; Hugh Neville; and Nicolino Fieschi. The full roster of the French delegates is not known, but they included Foulques of Chanac, bishop of Paris; the Dean of Clermont; Louis of Cerda, prince of Fortuna; Louis of Poitiers, count of Valentinois; and Simon Bucy, president of the Parlement of Paris.

They did not meet face to face, but each group talked to Clement, who conveyed messages between them. The terms of the truce required Clement to be neutral, but his behaviour outside the bounds of the conference was generally supportive of the French and the English were deeply distrustful of him. The proposals presented by each side to Clement were all unacceptable to the other, with neither displaying any willingness to compromise: the English demanded recognition of Edward as king of France as a starting point, the French insisted on acceptance of Philip's overlordship of Gascony. After four rounds of mediation Clement handed over the role of intermediary to a pair of cardinals. They made various proposals: one was that England accept the border of Aquitaine as agreed in 1303 by the Treaty of Paris, but with Aquitaine held as sovereign English territory; the French would not accept any diminution of their kingdom. Several suggestions were put to the English delegation by which either England generally or Edward personally would give up the claim to Aquitaine in exchange for territorial compensation elsewhere, but all were rejected.

Several members of the English delegation had left Avignon by December. Clement suggested that the largely ecclesiastical and low-status English delegation be replaced by high-status nobles, such as Northampton and Henry, Duke of Lancaster; both had been among the English negotiators who had agreed the truce at Malestroit so rapidly. But his plea was to no avail. The last English delegate at Avignon – Offord – was forbidden from leaving by Clement, but he fled in February 1345.

== Aftermath ==
Neither monarch took the provisions of the truce agreement seriously. Edward was planning another major invasion of France long before the truce was due to expire in September 1346. During the summer of 1343 Olivier of Clisson, a senior Breton lord, was invited from England to a tournament on French soil. As he was protected by the treaty he attended, but on the orders of the French king was arrested for treason and executed without trial. Edward formally renounced the truce on 15 June 1345. The fighting had continued much as before in Brittany and Gascony, and with Edward's repudiation of the truce Gascony reverted to full-scale war.

Edward personally led another expedition to France in 1346, this time landing in Normandy. His army was wholly English and Welsh this time and it laid waste to a 40-mile-wide (64 km) strip of some of the richest lands in France to within 2 miles (3 km) of Paris, sacking many towns on the way. On 26 August 1346 Philip was finally provoked into attacking at the battle of Crécy, where the French were defeated with a heavy loss of life. In the aftermath of this battle the English laid siege to the port of Calais, which fell in August 1347. The Truce of Calais was subsequently sealed on 28 September; originally due to expire on 7 July 1348, it was repeatedly extended until 1355, when full-scale war broke out once again.

== Notes, citations and sources ==
=== Sources ===
- Allmand, Christopher (2001). The Hundred Years' War: England and France at War, c. 1300–c. 1450. Cambridge: Cambridge University Press. ISBN 978-0-521-31923-2.
- Bárány, Attila (1997). "The Participation of the English Aristocracy in the First Phase of the Hundred Years War". Hungarian Journal of English and American Studies. 3 (2): 211–240. JSTOR 41273967.
- Bombi, Barbara (2019). Anglo-Papal Relations in the Early Fourteenth Century: A Study in Medieval Diplomacy. Oxford: Oxford University Press. ISBN 978-0-19-872915-0.
- Bordonove, Georges (2006). Charles VI: Le roi fol et bien-aimé. Les Rois qui ont fait la France (in French). Paris: Pygmalion. ISBN 978-2-7564-0018-1.
- Bove, Boris; Biget, Jean-Louis (2013). Le Temps de la Guerre de Cent Ans: 1328–1453 (in French). Vol. 1. Paris: Belin. ISBN 978-2-7011-3361-4.
- "Charles, Duke of Brittany". Britannica. Encyclopædia Britannica. 2025.
- Burne, Alfred (1999) [1955]. The Crécy War. Ware, Hertfordshire: Wordsworth Editions. ISBN 978-1-84022-210-4.
- Curry, Anne (2002). The Hundred Years' War 1337–1453. Essential Histories. Oxford: Osprey Publishing. ISBN 978-1-84176-269-2.
- Cushway, Graham (2011). Edward III and the War at Sea. Woodbridge, Suffolk: Boydell Press. ISBN 978-1-84383-621-6.
- Déprez, Eugène (1967). "La Conference Avignon (1344)". In Little, A. G. & Powicke, F. M. (eds.). Essays in Medieval History Presented to Thomas Frederick Tout (in French). Freeport, New York: Books for Libraries Press. pp. 301–320. ISBN 978-0-8369-0427-7.
- Fowler, Kenneth Alan (1969). The King's Lieutenant: Henry of Grosmont, First Duke of Lancaster, 1310–1361. New York: Barnes & Noble. ISBN 978-0-389-01003-6.
- Frélaut, Bertrand (2005). Histoire de Vannes (in French). Paris: Gisser. ISBN 978-2-87747-527-3.
- Fryde, E. B.; Greenway, D. E.; Porter, S. & Roy, I. (1996). Handbook of British Chronology (Third revised ed.). Cambridge: Cambridge University Press. ISBN 978-0-521-56350-5.
- Friel, Ian (2003). "Oars, Sails and Guns: The English and War at Sea, c. 1200-c. 1500". In Hattendorf, John; Unger, Richard (eds.). War at Sea in the Middle Ages and the Renaissance. Woodbridge, Suffolk: Boydell Press. pp. 69–82. ISBN 978-0-85115-903-4.
- Graham-Goering, Erika (2020). Princely Power in Late Medieval France: Jeanne de Penthièvre and the War for Brittany. Cambridge: Cambridge University Press. ISBN 978-1-108-80554-4.
- Hoskins, Peter (2011). In the Steps of the Black Prince: The Road to Poitiers, 1355–1356. Woodbridge, Suffolk: Boydell. ISBN 978-1-84383-611-7.
- Jones, Michael (1988). The Creation of Brittany: A Late Medieval State. London: Hambledon Press. ISBN 978-0-907628-80-4.
- Luyster, Amanda (2011). "Christ's Golden Voice: The Chapels of St. Martial and St. John in the Palace of the Popes, Avignon". Word & Image. 2011 (July): 334–346. doi:10.1080/02666286.2011.541119.
- Mortimer, Ian (2007). The Perfect King: The Life of Edward III, Father of the English Nation. London: Pimlico. ISBN 978-1-84413-530-1.
- Neillands, Robin (2001). The Hundred Years War. London; New York: Routledge. ISBN 978-0-415-26131-9.
- Ormrod, W. Mark (1990). Edward III. New Haven, Connecticut: Yale University Press. ISBN 978-0-300-11910-7. OCLC 1039705847.
- Prestwich, M. (1980). The Three Edwards: War and State in England, 1272–1377. Fakenham, Norfolk: Weidenfeld & Nicolson. ISBN 978-0-29777-730-4.
- Rodger, N. A. M. (2004). The Safeguard of the Sea: A Naval History of Britain. 660–1649. Vol. I. London: Penguin. ISBN 978-0-14-029724-9.
- Rogers, Clifford (1998). "An Unknown News Bulletin from the Siege of Tournai in 1340". War in History. 5 (3): 358–366. doi:10.1177/096834459800500305. JSTOR 26007300.
- Rogers, Clifford J. (2014) [2000]. War Cruel and Sharp: English Strategy under Edward III, 1327–1360. Woodbridge, Suffolk: Boydell & Brewer. OCLC 804338875.
- Rose, Susan (2007). The Medieval Sea. London: Bloomsbury. ISBN 978-1-85285-563-5.
- Sadler, John (2013) [2005], Border Fury: England and Scotland at War 1296–1568, London; New York: Routledge, ISBN 978-1-4058-4022-4
- Sumption, Jonathan (1990). The Hundred Years War 1: Trial by Battle. London: Faber & Faber. ISBN 978-0-571-13895-1.
- Visser, Nils & Snijder, Willeke (2014). "The Flame of Britanny: Jeanne de Flandres". Medieval Warfare. 4 (2): 33–38. JSTOR 48578335.
- Wagner, John A. (2006). Encyclopedia of the Hundred Years War. Woodbridge, Suffolk: Greenwood. ISBN 978-0-313-32736-0.
- Zutshi, P. N. R. (2000). "The Avignon Papacy". In Jones, Michael (ed.). The New Cambridge Medieval History, c.1300–c.1415. Vol. 6. Cambridge: Cambridge University Press. pp. 653–673. ISBN 978-0-521-36290-0.
