= Michel Pouchard =

French chemist (born 1938)

- Born: 23 January 1938 (age 87); Avrillé-les-Ponceaux, France
- Education: University of Rennes; University of Bordeaux
- Scientific career
- Institutions: University of Bordeaux
- Doctoral advisor: Paul Hagenmuller

Michel Pouchard (born 23 January, 1938 in Avrillé-les-Ponceaux) is a French chemist specialising in the physico-chemistry of inorganic solids.

== Biography ==
After studying at the David high school in Angers and at the faculties of science at University of Rennes and University of Bordeaux, Michel Pouchard specializes in the physico-chemistry of inorganic solids: oxides of transition metals, electronic properties (magnetism, insulation-to-metal transition) and electrochemistry (materials for energy, membranes, electrodes for SOFC fuel cells in particular), nanocrystalline silicon) and in the science of functional materials.

Trainee then research associate at the CNRS from 1960 to 1967 (director of the materials technology dissemination department at the CNRS from 1975 to 1984), he was a lecturer at the Faculty of Sciences, University of Bordeaux from 1967 to 1970, then professor at the University of Bordeaux I from 1970 to 1992 (professor emeritus from 2004). From 1992 to 2002, he was a professor at the Institut universitaire de France (of which he was a director from 1993 to 1997).

He was elected a member of the French Academy of sciences on 16 November 1992. He is also a member of the Academy of Technologies, the French Society of Chemistry, the Academia europaea (1998) and the Leopoldina Academy (Germany) (2000).

== Publications ==
Michel Pouchard is the author of nearly 400 articles published in the best journals in solid-state chemistry and materials science and some fifteen patents.

== Distinctions ==
=== Prices ===
Langevin Prize of the French Academy of sciences (1977)

=== Decorations ===
- Chevalier of the Légion d'honneur.
- Commandeur of the Ordre national du mérite. He was promoted to officier on May 15, 2017, and then obtained the rank of commandeur by decree on November 18, 2017.
- Commandeur of the Ordre des Palmes académiques.
