= Avrillé =

Avrillé is the name or part of the name of the following communes in France:

- Avrillé, Maine-et-Loire, in the Maine-et-Loire department
- Avrillé, Vendée, in the Vendée department
- Avrillé-les-Ponceaux, in the Indre-et-Loire department
