= Chapel of the Madeleine, Malestroit =

Ruined chapel in Brittany, France

Chapel of the Madeleine, Malestroit Chapelle de la Madeleine de Malestroit
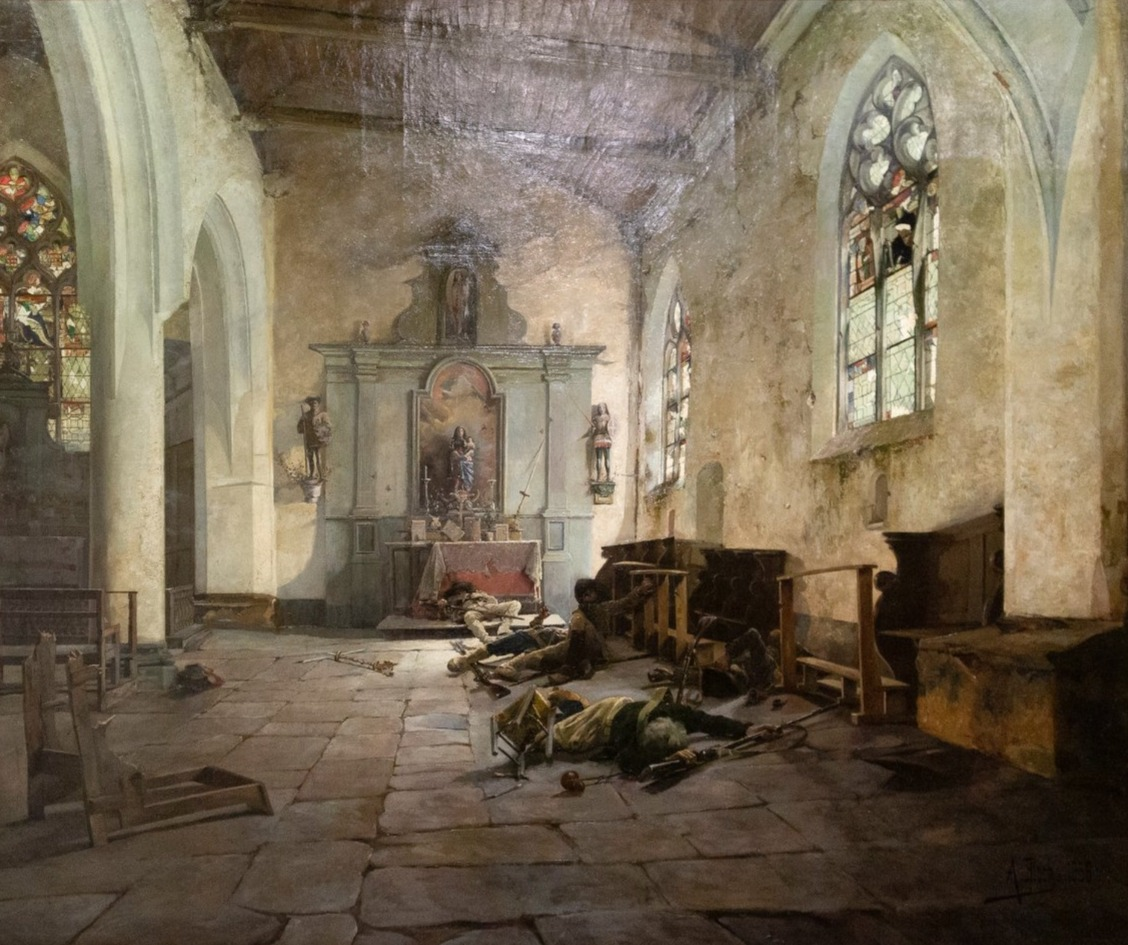
- Alexandre Bloch, 1886: La Chapelle de La Madeleine à Malestroit (Morbihan) - 15 nivose an III (Musée des Beaux-Arts de Quimper)

Religion
- Affiliation: Catholic Church
- Ecclesiastical or organisational status: Chapel
- Status: Not active

Location
- Location: Malestroit, Morbihan, Bretagne, France
- Interactive map of Chapel of the Madeleine, Malestroit; Chapelle de la Madeleine de Malestroit
- Coordinates: 47°48′44″N 2°22′39″W

Architecture
- Completed: 17th century

The Chapel of the Madeleine, formerly the Priory of the Madeleine or Malestroit Priory (French: Chapelle de la Madeleine; Prieuré de la Madeleine de Malestroit), is a ruined chapel in Malestroit, in the Morbihan department of Brittany, France.

== History and description ==
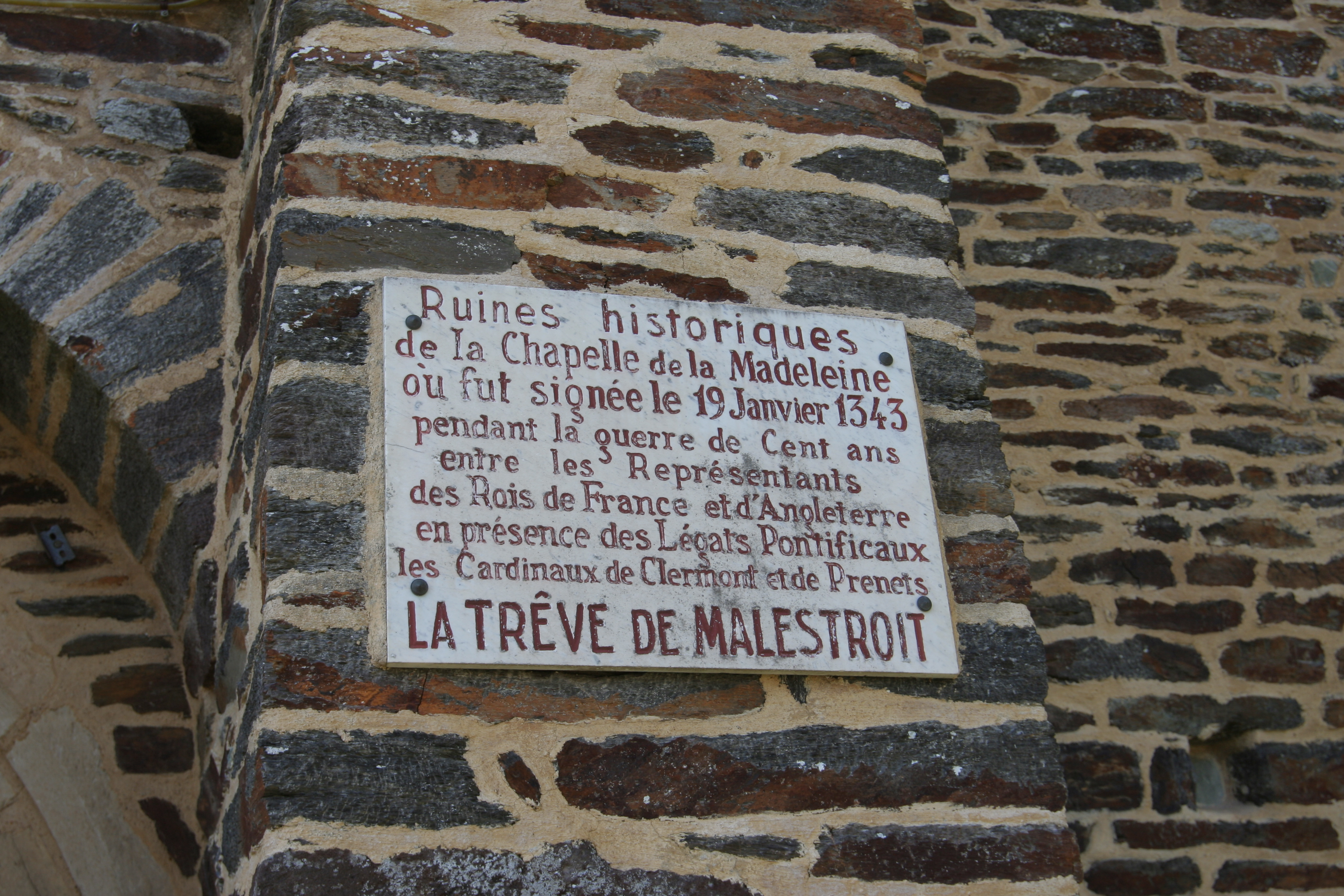
Plaque on the ruins recording the signing of the truce

The ruins, which are mediaeval with some 17th-century additions, are of an ancient leper hospital, which became in 1129 a priory of Marmoutier Abbey. In 1343, the plenipotentiaries of Philip VI of Valois and Edward III of England signed the Truce of Malestroit here.

The chapel was the scene of battle in January 1795 (Nivôse An III) when a group of Chouans were massacred inside its walls. The violence of the fighting is illustrated in the painting by Alexandre Bloch.

The chapel became disused in 1870. Its stained glass windows, depicting the story of Mary Magdalene, were bought by Emile Zola and later sold to an American museum. The bell-gable with fortified steeple is reputedly the oldest in the department.

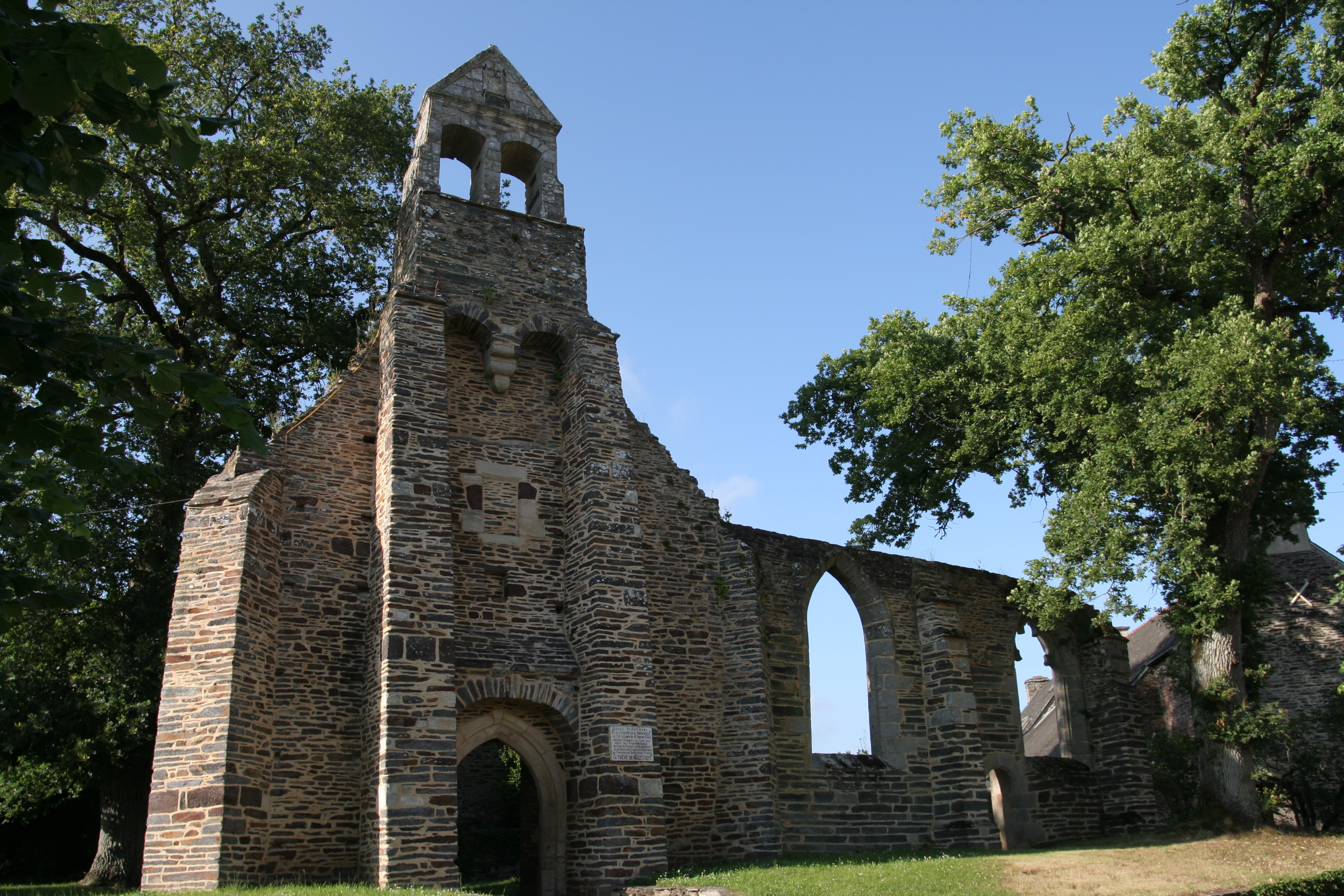
The chapel ruins

The ruins of the chapel were registered as an historical monument in December 1934.
