= Jean-Marie Tarascon =

French chemist

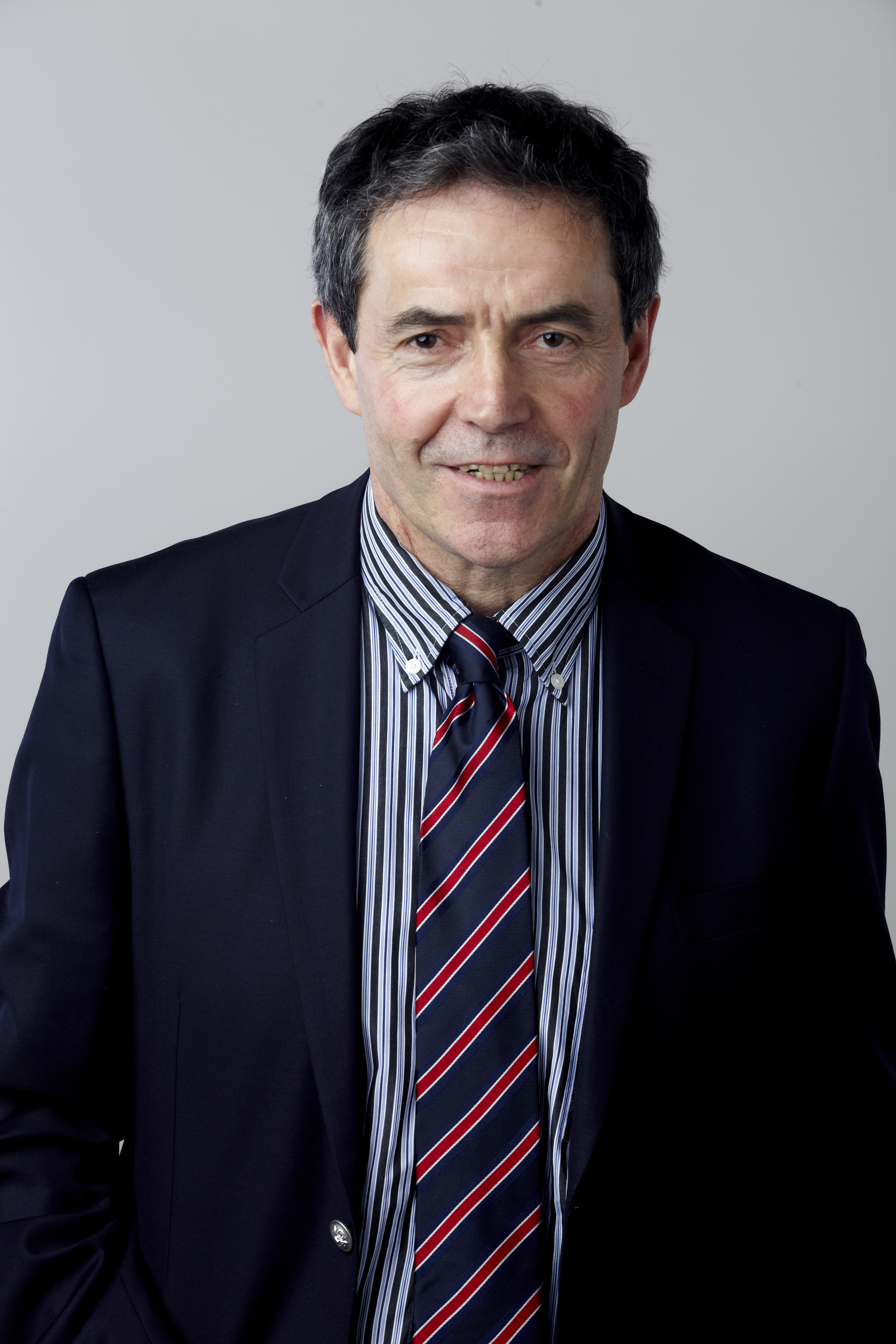
- Jean-Marie Tarascon in 2014, portrait via the Royal Society
- Born: September 21, 1953 (age 72)
- Education: University of Bordeaux (MSc, PhD)
- Awards: Member of the French Academy of Sciences (2005); Chevalier de la Légion d'Honneur (2009); ENI award (2011); ForMemRS (2014); FRSC (2015); Balzan Prize (2020)
- Scientific career
- Fields: Nanomaterials; Materials science; Superconductivity; Molecular electronics; Sodium-Ion battery; Lithium polymer batteries
- Workplaces: Collège de France; Hong Kong University of Science and Technology; University of Picardie; Bell Labs; Bellcore; Cornell University
- Doctoral advisor: Paul Hagenmuller
- Website: www.college-de-france.fr/site/jean-marie-tarascon www.solid-state-chemistry-energy-lab.org

Jean-Marie Tarascon FRSC (born September 21, 1953) is professor of chemistry at the Collège de France in Paris and director of the French Research Network on Electrochemical Energy Storage (RS2E).

== Education ==
Tarascon was educated at the University of Bordeaux, where he was awarded a Diplôme d'études universitaires générales in physics and chemistry, a Master of Science degree in chemical engineering, and a PhD in solid-state chemistry in 1981.

== Career ==
Following his PhD, Tarascon did postdoctoral research at Cornell University. He worked at Bell Labs and Bellcore from 1982 to 1994, then moved to the University of Picardie Jules Verne in 1994. He has been at the College de France since 2010. He is also credited with laying foundations of the reputable Erasmus mundus masters course in energy storage and conversion "Materials for energy storage and conversion" hosted by UPJV, Amiens in association with seven universities across the globe and several energy research networks.

== Research ==
Tarascon's research investigates the synthesis of novel electronic phenomena and materials such as superconductors, ferroelectrics, fluoride glasses, rechargeable batteries and colossal magnetoresistance. He has made many contributions to superconductivity and was the original proponent of the thin and flexible plastic lithium ion battery.

== Awards and honours ==
Tarascon was elected a Foreign Member of the Royal Society (ForMemRS) in 2014. His nomination reads:

Jean-Marie Tarascon is distinguished for his outstanding leadership in the materials chemistry of energy conversion and storage devices and for seminal studies of high temperature superconductors. His pioneering work on electrode reaction processes that can store more energy than those in conventional lithium-ion batteries, his work on molecular electrodes and his realization of the plastic battery, have changed thinking in the field.

Tarascon was honoured by the New Jersey Inventors Hall of Fame in 2002. He was nominated to the Académie des Sciences in 2005, and was the University of Picardie Jules Verne (UPJV) gold medalist in 2008. He won the ENI Protection of the Environment award in 2011. In 2015 he was awarded the Royal Society of Chemistry's Centenary Prize. In 2016, he received an honorary doctorate 'doctor honoris causa' from Hasselt University. In 2017, he was one of the two winners of the Eric and Sheila Samson Prime Minister's Prize for Innovation in Alternative Fuels for Transportation. He was one of the five nominated for the CNRS Innovation Medals. In 2020 he received the Balzan Prize for Environmental Challenges: Materials Science for Renewable Energy.
