= Paul Hagenmuller =

French chemist (1921–2017)

- Born: August 3, 1921; Alsace, France
- Died: January 7, 2017 (aged 95); Gradignan, France
- Citizenship: French
- Education: University of Strasbourg; University of Clermont-Ferrand; Sorbonne University
- Known for: solid-state chemistry
- Scientific career
- Institutions: University of Rennes; University of Bordeaux; CNRS
- Thesis: Contribution à l’étude des nitrites en solution aqueuse (1950)
- Doctoral advisor: André Chrétien
- Doctoral students: Jean Rouxel; Michel Pouchard; Jean-Marie Tarascon; Khalil Amine

Paul Hagenmuller (August 3, 1921 – January 7, 2017) was a French chemist. Hagenmuller founded the Laboratoire de Chimie du Solide (Solid-State Chemistry Laboratory) of the French National Centre for Scientific Research (CNRS) and he served as its Director until 1985. He is considered "one of the founders of solid-state chemistry."

== Biography ==
Hagenmuller was born in 1921 in Alsace, France. After studying in Strasbourg and Clermont-Ferrand, during WW2, Hagenmuller was imprisoned in the Buchenwald and Mittelbau-Dora concentration camps. During those years, he was involved in sabotaging German missiles. In 1950 he received his PhD from Sorbonne University. Subsequently, he spent two years teaching as a lecturer (maître de conférences) in Vietnam. He returned to France in 1956 and was appointed Professor of Inorganic Chemistry at the University of Rennes, working on "nonstoichiometry in vanadium and tungsten bronzes, two-dimensional oxyhalogenides, borides, and silicides, magnetic spinels". In 1961 he started working at the University of Bordeaux.

Hagenmuller was noted for instigating cooperation between French researchers and researchers from the Soviet Union and Germany, his years in the concentration camps greatly affected his character. He also collaborated with noted scientists such as John Goodenough, Jacques Friedel and Nevill Francis Mott on insulator-to-metal transitions of vanadium oxides. In the 1970s, he started working with Neil Bartlett on metal fluorides. His most noted research discovery was the synthesis of LaCuO_{3} and LaSrCuO_{4}, which would later become important superconductor materials. His work on sodium-ion batteries received great interest years after it was published.

In 2018 Hagenmuller remained the 4th most cited author from the Journal of Solid State Chemistry.

== Awards and decorations ==
- Croix de Guerre 1939–1945
- Bundesverdienstkreuz (1985)
- Legion of Honour (1988)
- Gay-Lussac Humboldt Prize (1982)
- Prix de la Fondation de la Maison de la Chimie (1986)

== Bibliography ==
- Hagenmuller, Paul (1972). Preparative Methods in Solid State Chemistry. Saint Louis: Elsevier Science. ISBN 978-0-323-14436-0. OCLC 1044715140.
- Bevan, D. J. M; Hagenmuller, P (1973). Non-stoichiometric compounds: tungsten bronzes, vanadium bronzes and related compounds. Elsevier. ISBN 978-1-4831-5176-2. OCLC 881849225.
- Gool, W. van; Hagenmuller, Paul (1978). Solid electrolytes: general principles, characterization, materials, applications. New York: Academic Press. ISBN 978-0-12-313360-1. OCLC 919504227.
- Hagenmuller, Paul (1985). Inorganic solid fluorides: chemistry and physics. Academic Press. ISBN 978-0-12-412490-5. OCLC 1007845115.
