= Christiane Marchello-Nizia =

Linguist & philologist (born 1941)

Christiane Marchello-Nizia (born 1941) is a French linguist who specializes in the history of the French language. She was professor at the École normale supérieure de Lyon and Director of the Institute for French Linguistics (Institut de Linguistique Française) until her retirement in 2006.

== Biography ==
Marchello-Nizia studied at the École normale supérieure de Fontenay-Saint Cloud, receiving her doctorate in 1975. She subsequently held a position as assistant professor at Sorbonne University (1966–70) before returning to the École normale supérieure de Fontenay as associate professor (1970–84), then full professor (1984-2006); the ENS moved to Lyon in 2000. From 1994 until 2004 she was a senior member of the Institut Universitaire de France, and between 1997 and 2000 director there.

Marchello-Nizia has been the recipient of numerous national and international awards. In 1998 she was made a Knight of the Legion of Honour for services to education, and was promoted to Officer in 2013. She has been a member of the Finnish Academy of Science and Letters since 2002, and was awarded an honorary doctorate by the University of Helsinki in 2003. In 2021 she was elected Member of the Academia Europaea. For her two-volume historical grammar of French (Grande Grammaire Historique du Français) she and her co-authors were also awarded the 2021 Prix Honoré Chavée by the Académie des Inscriptions et Belles-Lettres.

== Research ==
Marchello-Nizia has made contributions to research across the areas of historical linguistics, language change, historical pragmatics, diachronic syntax, grammaticalization, the history of the French language, Romance corpus linguistics, text editing, and the semiotics of medieval French texts.

== Selected publications ==
- Marchello-Nizia, Christiane. 1978. Ponctuation et «unités de lecture» dans les manuscrits médiévaux ou: je ponctue, tu lis, il théorise (Punctuation and "units of reading" in medieval manuscripts: or, I punctuate, you read, he theorizes). Langue Française 40, 32-44.
- Marchello-Nizia, Christiane. 1981. Amour courtois, société masculine et figures du pouvoir (Courtly love, masculine society and figures of power). Annales. Histoire, Sciences Sociales 36 (6), 969-982.
- Marchello-Nizia, Christiane. 1985. Dire le vrai: l'adverbe "si" en français médiéval: essai de linguistique historique (Telling the truth: the adverb "si" in medieval French: essay on historical linguistics). Geneva: Droz. ISBN 9782600028608
- Marchello-Nizia, Christiane. 1999. Le français en diachronie: douze siècles d'évolution (French in diachrony: twelve centuries of evolution). Paris: Ophrys. ISBN 9782708009134
- Marchello-Nizia, Christiane. 2006. Grammaticalisation et changement linguistique (Grammaticalization and language change). Brussels: De Boeck-Duculot. ISBN 9782801116074
- Marchello-Nizia, Christiane, Bernard Combettes, Sophie Prévost, and Tobias Scheer. 2020. Grande Grammaire Historique du Français (Great Historical Grammar of French). 2 vols. ISBN 9783110348194
