= Alexandre Bloch =

French painter (1857–1919)

Alexandre Bloch (29 May 1857 – 11 November 1919) was a French academic painter, specialising in military subjects.

== Biography ==
Bloch was born in the Boulevard de la Chapelle, 18th arrondissement of Paris. He was a pupil of Jean-Léon Gérôme and Jules Bastien-Lepage. He first exhibited at the Salon in 1880. He was a painter of genre scenes but also of historical patriotic subjects, exhibiting pictures at the Salon of episodes from the Chouannerie and the Franco-Prussian War.

He was created a Chevalier of the Légion d'honneur in 1911 for his services as a lieutenant of the military reserve in a territorial infantry regiment.

At his death he was an accredited military artist of the Musée de l'Armée in Paris.

He died unmarried on 11 November 1919 in the Hôpital Tenon in the 20th arrondissement of Paris.

== Selected paintings ==
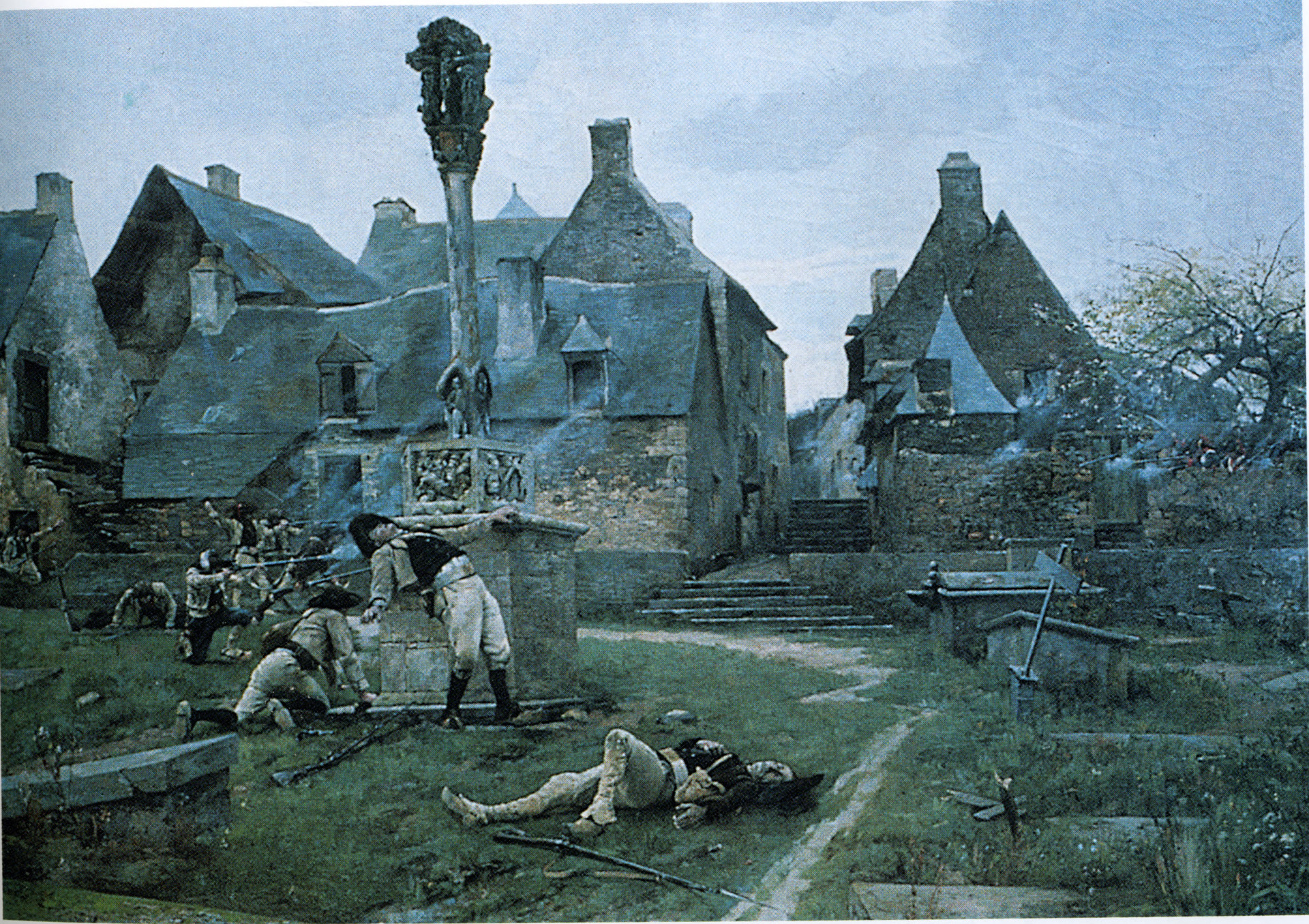
The Defense of Rochefort-en-Terre (1885)

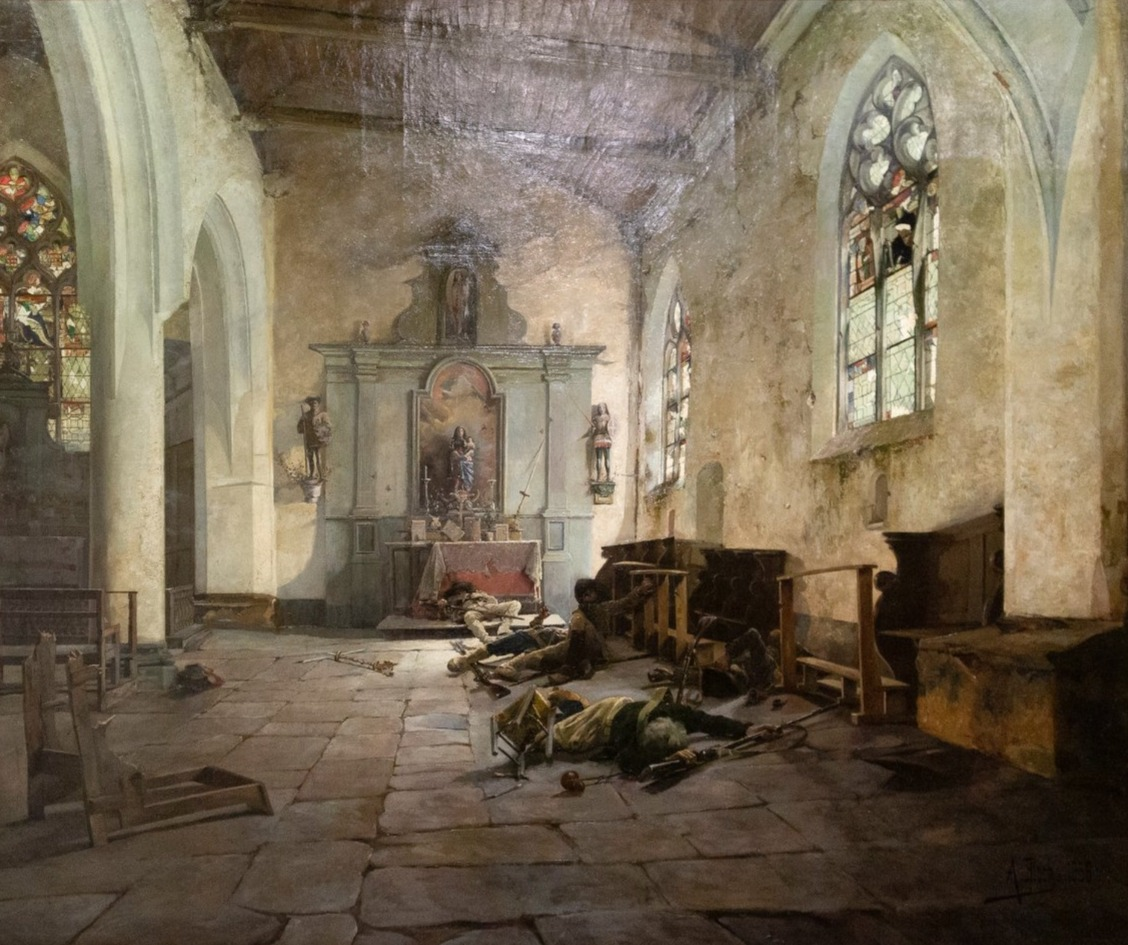
La Madeleine Chapel in Malestroit - 15 Nivôse, year III (1886)

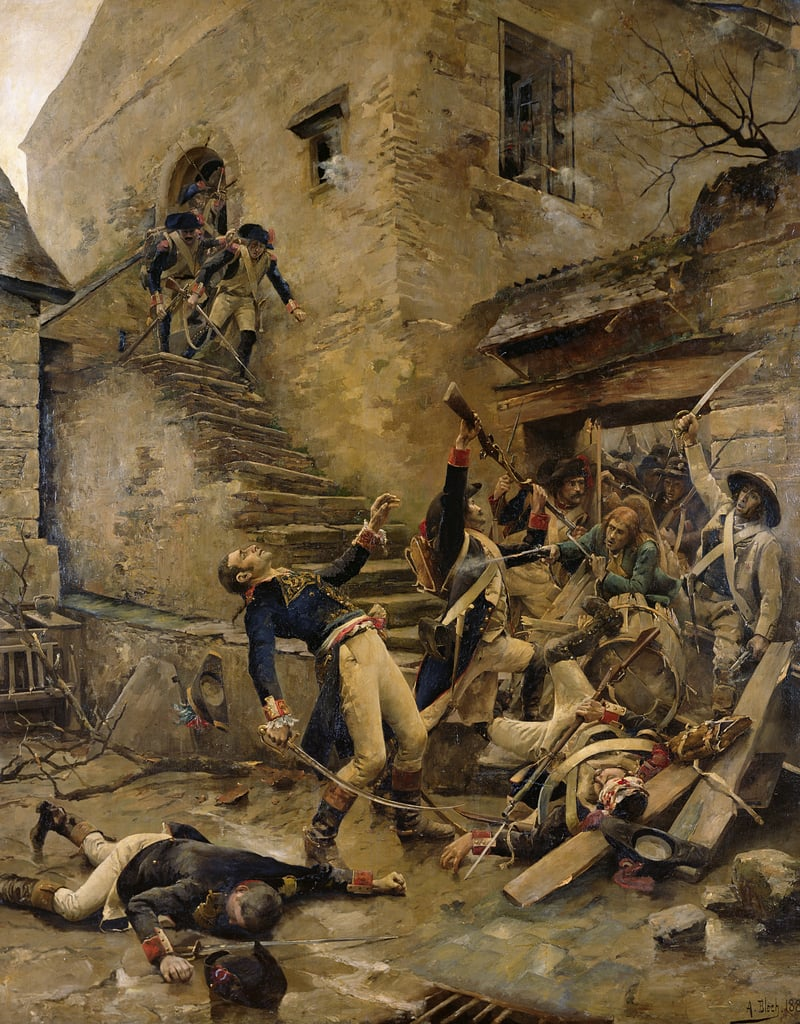
Death of Michel de Beaupuy (1888)

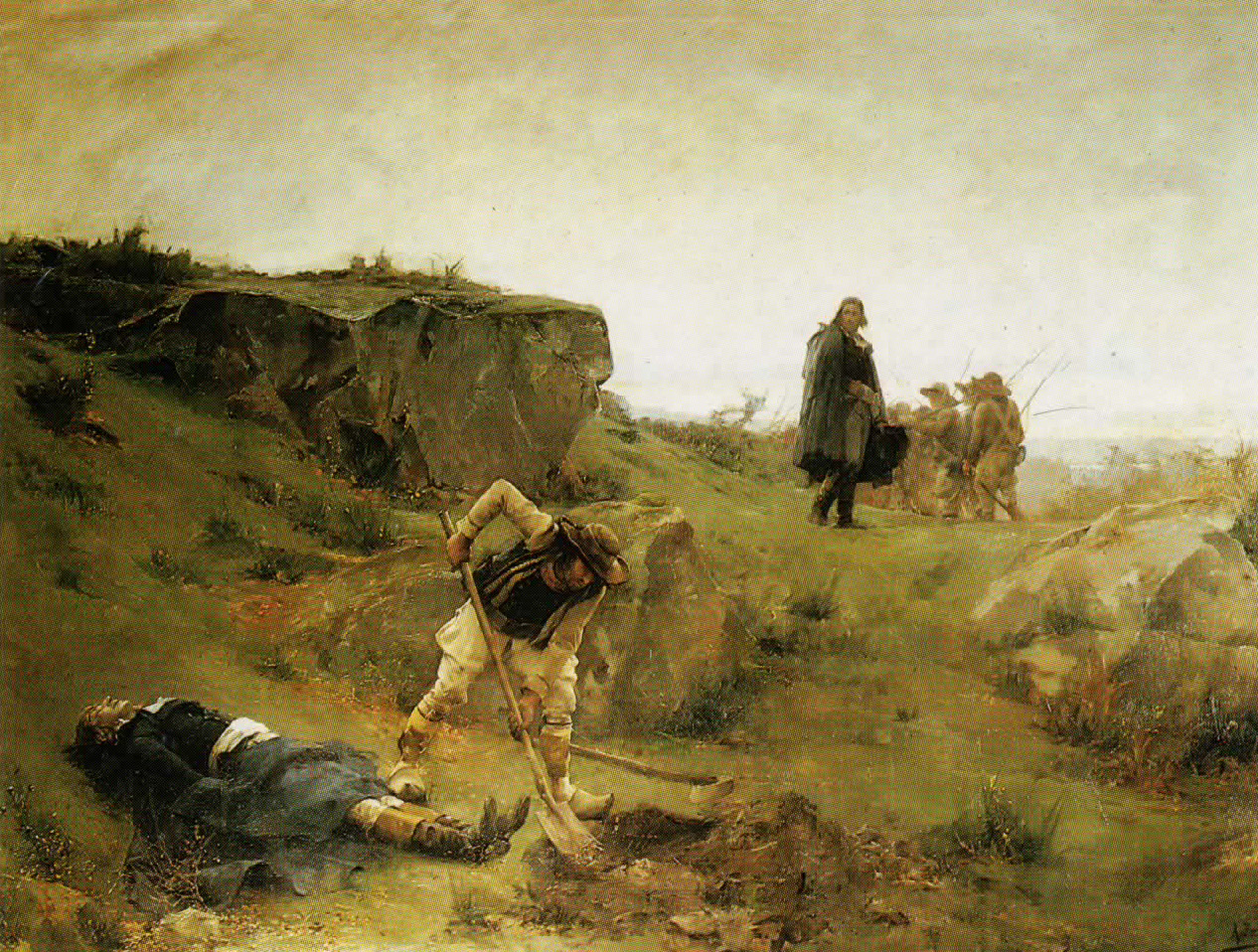
Death of Henri de La Rochejaquelein

== Works ==
- Défense de Rochefort-en-terre, 1885, Conservatoire départemental du patrimoine, department of Morbihan
- Mort de Henri de La Rochejaquelein, Musée Dobrée, Nantes
- La Chapelle de La Madeleine à Malestroit (Morbihan) - 15 nivôse an III, 1886, Musée des beaux-arts de Quimper
- Mort du général de Beaupuy à Château-Gontier, 1888, Musée des beaux-arts de Rennes
- Le Lieutenant Chabal prenant un drapeau à l'ennemi en 1870, 1902, Musée des beaux-arts de Chambéry
- Le drapeau de Mars-la-Tour, présenté au Salon de 1902, Musée de la Princerie, Verdun
