= Institut Universitaire de France =

French university institution

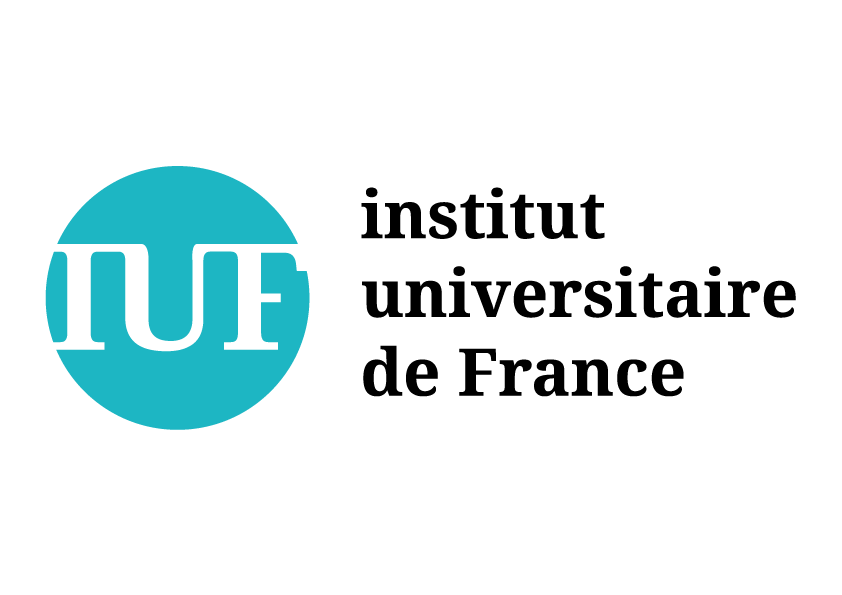
- Parent institution: French Ministry of Higher Education
- Established: 26 August 1991
- Mission: Development of high-level research in French universities
- Administrator: Elyès Jouini
- Location: France
- Website: http://www.iufrance.fr/

The Institut Universitaire de France (IUF; "Academic Institute of France") is a service of the French Ministry of Higher Education that annually distinguishes a small number of university professors for their research excellence, as evidenced by their international recognition. Only around 2% of French university faculty are members (active or honorary) of the IUF.

== Organization ==
The Institute was created by decree on 26 August 1991. At least two-thirds of IUF members belong to universities outside Paris. The purpose of the IUF is to encourage the development of high-level, interdisciplinary research in universities. It has three primary objectives:

1. To encourage institutions and research professors to achieve excellence in research, creating positive impacts on teaching, the training of young researchers and the dissemination of knowledge;
2. Contribute to the feminization of the research sector;
3. Foster a balanced distribution of university research across the country, and thus support a policy of scientific networking.

The IUF is composed of two types of faculty members (professors or lecturers): senior members, who have earned international recognition for their work; and junior members, who are promising young scholars under 40 years old. Members are appointed for five years (not renewable for junior members, renewable once for senior members).

Members remain attached to their home university. To help them pursue and disseminate their research, French members benefit from a two-thirds reduction of their statutory teaching duties. Research funds are credited to their team or laboratory (€15,000 per year over five years). They also automatically receive the national award of scientific excellence (Prime d'Encadrement Doctoral et de Recherche, or PEDR): a minimum annual award of €6,000 for junior members or €10,000 for senior members. A progress report is requested halfway through their five-year term and then again at the end of their term. Members of the Institut Universitaire de France must contribute to local, national and international scientific development, with a strong focus on interdisciplinarity.

Each year, a symposium brings together members of the IUF in order to allow for discussion to take place at the highest level of French research.

== Jury selection ==
Each year, the minister responsible for higher education appoints the members of the junior and senior juries, as well as their presidents, on the recommendation of an administrator, after consultation with the strategic and scientific council of the IUF. The number of jury members is determined based on the number of applications for the year. Each of the two juries (senior and junior) must be composed of at least 30 full members, of which at least 20% are based in France and at least 40% based outside France. At least 40% of jury members must come from scientific and medical disciplines, and at least a further 40% from the humanities and social sciences. The presidency of the juries alternates each year between the scientific and medical disciplines, and the humanities and social sciences. A member can not serve on more than three juries within a 10-year period.

The juries are responsible for ensuring that the balance of disciplines is respected and that the international reputation of the candidates is taken into account. Each jury establishes a list of candidates selected for nomination to the IUF and a complementary ranked list. The nomination proposals are then sent to the Minister of Higher Education.

== 2008 controversy ==
In 2008, Valérie Pécresse, the French minister of higher education and research at the time, provoked a scandal when she appointed an additional 22 members (9 juniors and 13 seniors) to the IUF who were not subject to the jury process. Appointments included Michel Maffesoli, a sociologist of disputed academic standing, of whom economist and jury president Elie Cohen said, "[he] would never have been selected by the jury even if there had been more places". On 24 September 2008, some senior and junior jurors of the IUF published a declaration that stated that they were indignant at the "lack of transparency and nominations for 2008". This declaration was supported by the Society Industrial and Applied Mathematics (SMAI) and the French Association for Scientific Information (AFIS). In an October 2008 letter addressed to Pécresse, the jury members wrote that they “are outraged by the lack of transparency of the 2008 appointments," and that they viewed the supplementary appointments as “an attack on the ethics of peer evaluation, which risks harming the national and international reputation of the Institute”.

== Administrators ==
- Christiane Marchello-Nizia (1991-1993)
- Michel Pouchard (1993-1997)
- Christiane Marchello-Nizia (1997-2000)
- Paul Clavin (2000-2005)
- Marie-Paule Pileni (2005-2010)
- Marie-Claude Maurel (2010-2013)
- Michel Cogné (2013-2018)
- Olivier Houdé (2018-2023)
- Elyès Jouini (2023-present)

== See also ==
- CNRS Gold medal
