= Soft chemistry =

Soft chemistry (also known as chimie douce) is a type of chemistry that uses reactions at ambient temperature in open reaction vessels with reactions similar to those occurring in biological systems.

== Aims ==
The aim of the soft chemistry is to synthesize materials, drawing capacity of living beings - more or less basic - such as diatoms capable of producing glass from silicates dissolved. It is a new branch of materials science that differs from conventional solid-state chemistry and its application to the intense energy to explore the chemical inventiveness of the living world. This specialty emerged in the 1980s around the label of "chimie douce", which was first published by the French chemist, Jacques Livage in Le Monde, 26 October 1977. French hits, the term soft chemistry is employed as such in the early twenty-first century in scientific publications, English and others. His mode of synthesis is similar generally for reactions involved in the polymerizations based on organic and the establishment of solutions reactive energy intake without essential polycondensation. The fundamental interest of this kind of polymerization mineral obtained at room temperature is to preserve organic molecules or microorganisms that wishes to fit. The products obtained by means of the so-called soft chemistry sol-gel can be stored in several types:

- mineral structures of various qualities (smoothness, uniformity, etc.)
- mixed structures combining inorganic and organic molecules on mineral structures
- wrapper complex molecules and even microorganisms maintaining or optimizing their beneficial characteristics.

The early results have included the creation of glasses and ceramic with new properties. These different structures are more or less composite mobilized a wide range of applications ranging from health to the needs of the conquest of space. Beyond its mode of synthesis, a compound with the label soft chemistry combines the advantages of the mineral (resistance, transparency, repetition patterns, etc.) and now exploring the potential of the biochemistry and organic chemistry (interface with the organic world, reactivity, synthesis capability, etc.). According to its practitioners, "soft chemistry" is only in its early success and opens up vast prospects.
