= Avrillé-les-Ponceaux =

- Commune
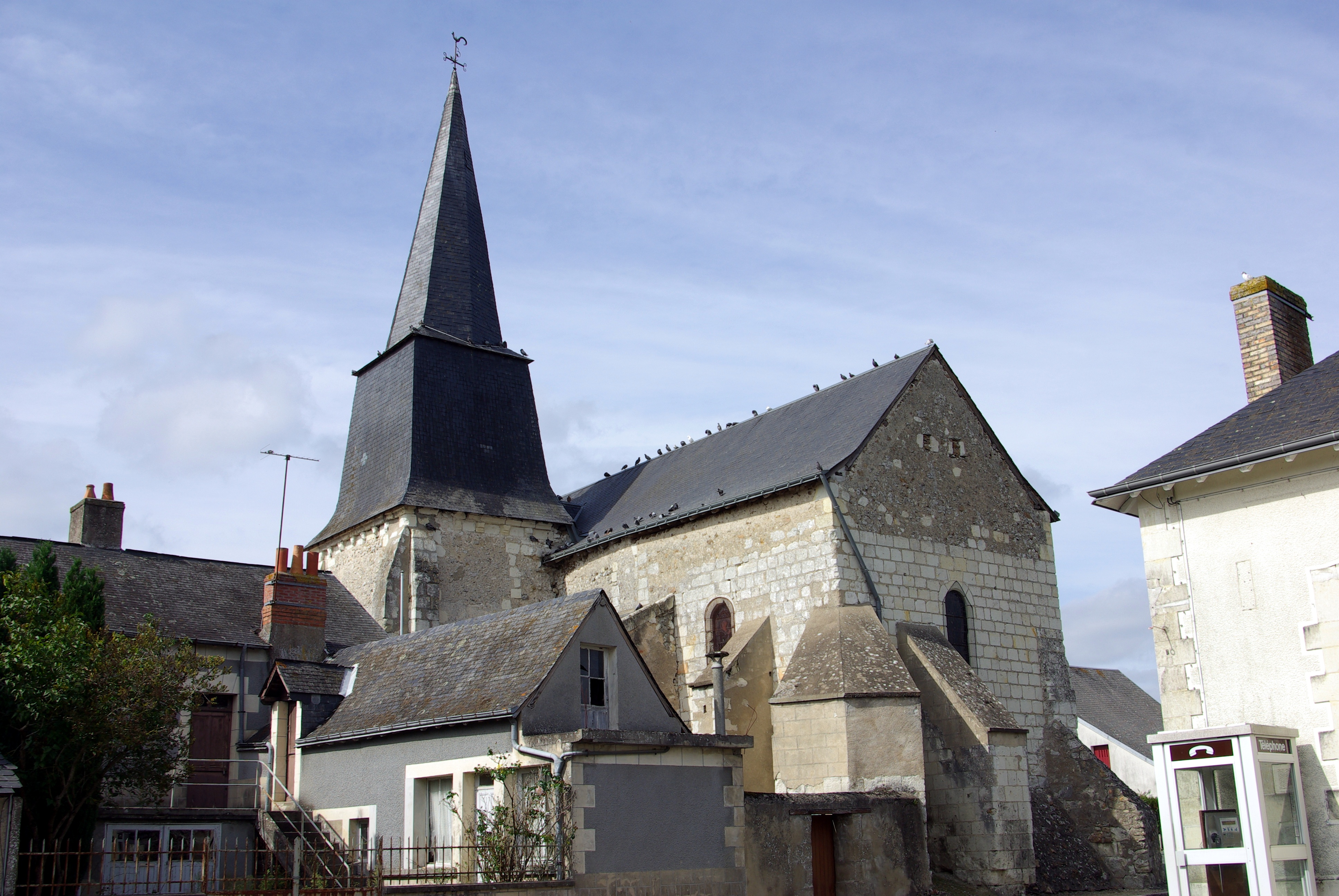
- The church of Saint-Aubin, in Avrillé-les-Ponceaux
- Location of Avrillé-les-Ponceaux
- Location within France Location within Centre-Val de Loire
- Coordinates: 47°23′43″N 0°17′14″E
- Country: France
- Region: Centre-Val de Loire
- Department: Indre-et-Loire
- Arrondissement: Chinon
- Canton: Langeais
- Intercommunality: CC Touraine Ouest Val Loire

Government
  - Mayor (2020–2026): Jean-Jack Bordeau
- Area^{1}: 32.8 km^{2} (12.7 sq mi)
- Highest elevation: 95 m (312 ft)
- Lowest elevation: 57 m (187 ft)
- Population (2023): 479
  - Density: 14.6/km^{2} (37.8/sq mi)
- Time zone: UTC+01:00 (CET)
  - Summer (DST): UTC+02:00 (CEST)
- INSEE/Postal code: 37013 /37340
- ^{1} French Land Register data, which excludes lakes, ponds, glaciers > 1 km^{2} (0.386 sq mi or 247 acres) and river estuaries.

Avrillé-les-Ponceaux (French pronunciation: [avʁije le pɔ̃so]) is a commune in the Indre-et-Loire department in central France.

== Population ==
Historical population
Year	Pop.	±% p.a.
1968	512	—
1975	438	−2.21%
1982	372	−2.31%
1990	366	−0.20%
1999	384	+0.53%
2007	447	+1.92%
2012	461	+0.62%
2017	481	+0.85%
2023	479	−0.07%
Source: INSEE

== See also ==
- Communes of the Indre-et-Loire department
