= Georges Bordonove =

French biographer and novelist

Georges Bordonove (25 May 1920, Enghien-les-Bains, Seine-et-Oise – 16 March 2007, Antony, Hauts-de-Seine) was a French biographer and novelist.

== Biography ==
Bordonove was a prolific writer of both books on history for a general readership and historical novels. His biographies, such as those of the kings of France, are characterised by short, dense chapters packed with detail including a potentially bewildering array of names and the citation of recorded conversations, sometimes in Old French with translations, but showing an evident sympathy for the subject, a desire to make a complete picture of his life and thought, and some sly humour. However, his 1980s series Les Rois qui ont fait la France (The Kings who Made France) has been called "more hagiographic than strictly historical". In his obituary in Le Monde, Philippe-Jean Catinchi wrote: "Despite his vision rarely conforming to the state of historical research, the public approved" and noted that he also contributed to a historical survey of everyday life.

He was a member of the sustaining committee of the royalist Association Unité capétienne (Capetian Unity Society) and of the jury awarding its Hugues-Capet Prize.

He is buried in the cemetery of Le Château-d'Oléron on the island of Oléron.

== Honours ==
- Officier (Officer) of the Légion d'honneur
- Award from the Académie française for novel Les Quatre Cavaliers and historical study Les Marins de l'An II
- Prix Goncourt for history for Le Naufrage de 'La Méduse'
- Grand prix des libraires (Booksellers' award)
