= Malestroit =

Commune in Brittany, France

Malestroit Malastred
- Commune
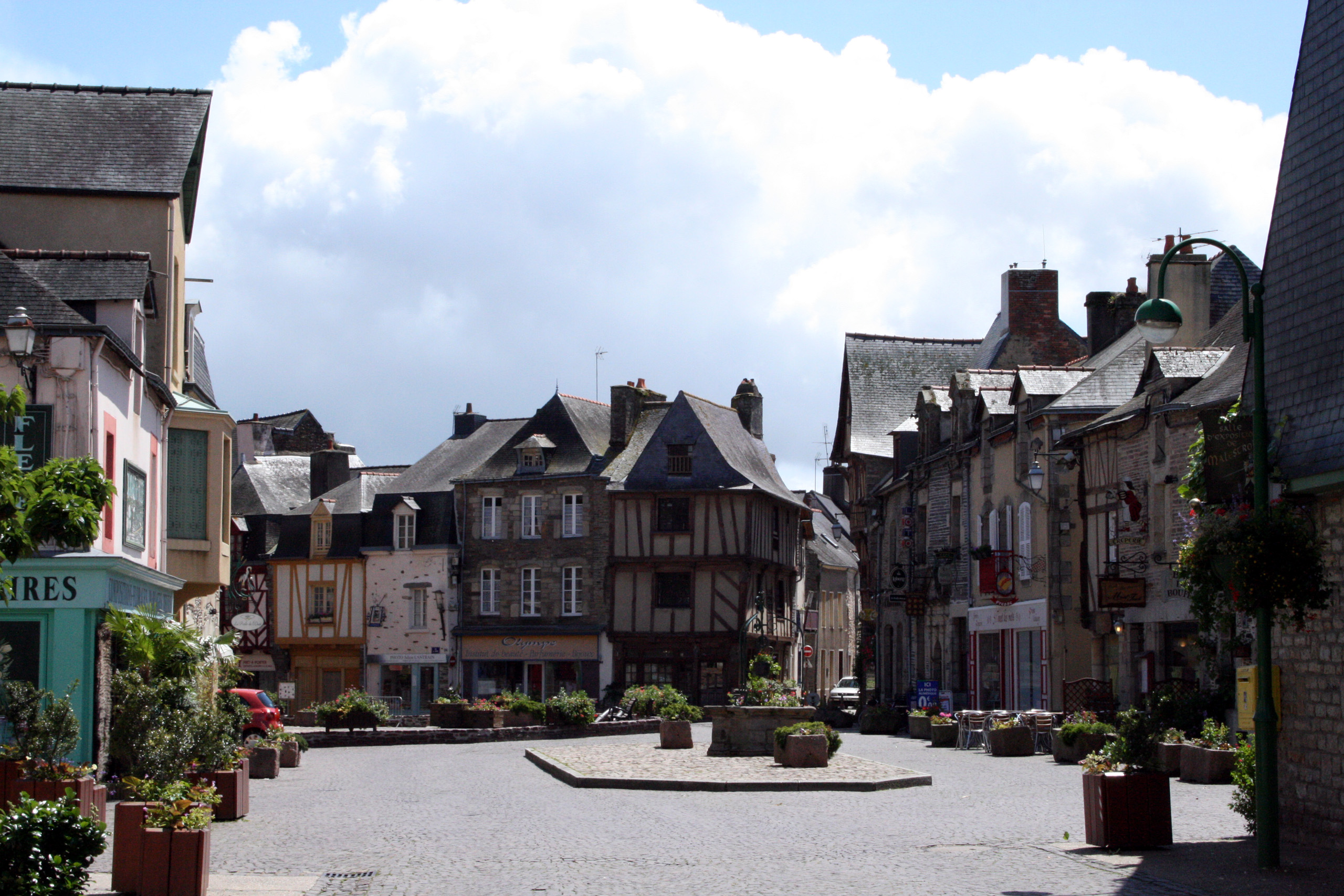
- Bouffay Square in Malestroit

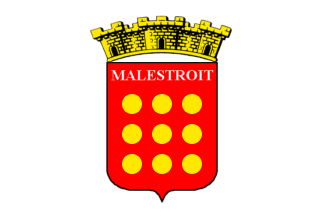
- Flag Coat of arms
- Location of Malestroit
- Location within France Location within Brittany
- Coordinates: 47°48′38″N 2°22′56″W
- Country: France
- Region: Brittany
- Department: Morbihan
- Arrondissement: Vannes
- Canton: Moréac
- Intercommunality: CC de l'Oust à Brocéliande

Government
  - Mayor (2026–32): Bruno Gicquello
- Area^{1}: 5.81 km^{2} (2.24 sq mi)
- Highest elevation: 95 m (312 ft)
- Lowest elevation: 10 m (33 ft)
- Population (2023): 2,558
  - Density: 440/km^{2} (1,140/sq mi)
- Time zone: UTC+01:00 (CET)
  - Summer (DST): UTC+02:00 (CEST)
- INSEE/Postal code: 56124 /56140
- ^{1} French Land Register data, which excludes lakes, ponds, glaciers > 1 km^{2} (0.386 sq mi or 247 acres) and river estuaries.

Malestroit (French pronunciation: [maletʁwa]; Breton: Malastred) is a commune in the Morbihan department of Brittany in north-western France. The town is on the river Oust and part of the Nantes-Brest canal. It has several half-timbered houses.

== Population ==
Historical population
| Year | Pop. | ±% p.a. |
|---|---|---|
| 1968 | 2,483 | — |
| 1975 | 2,506 | +0.13% |
| 1982 | 2,465 | −0.24% |
| 1990 | 2,357 | −0.56% |
| 1999 | 2,472 | +0.53% |
| 2007 | 2,478 | +0.03% |
| 2012 | 2,497 | +0.15% |
| 2017 | 2,456 | −0.33% |
| 2023 | 2,558 | +0.68% |
Source: INSEE

== Tourism ==
Malestroit is on the Nantes-Brest canal, which is no longer completely navigable. However, the section through the town is over 200 km long, and barges moor up near the centre of Malestroit. It is possible to hire a boat to explore the waterway. The nearby village of Saint-Marcel houses a museum dedicated to the Breton Resistance movement where a battle against the Nazis took place and was won by the Resistance fighters.

== Twinning ==
Malestroit, whose inhabitants are known in French as Malestroyens, is twinned with the town of Jedburgh in the United Kingdom.

== See also ==
- Communes of the Morbihan department
