= Stéphane Le Diraison =

French sailor

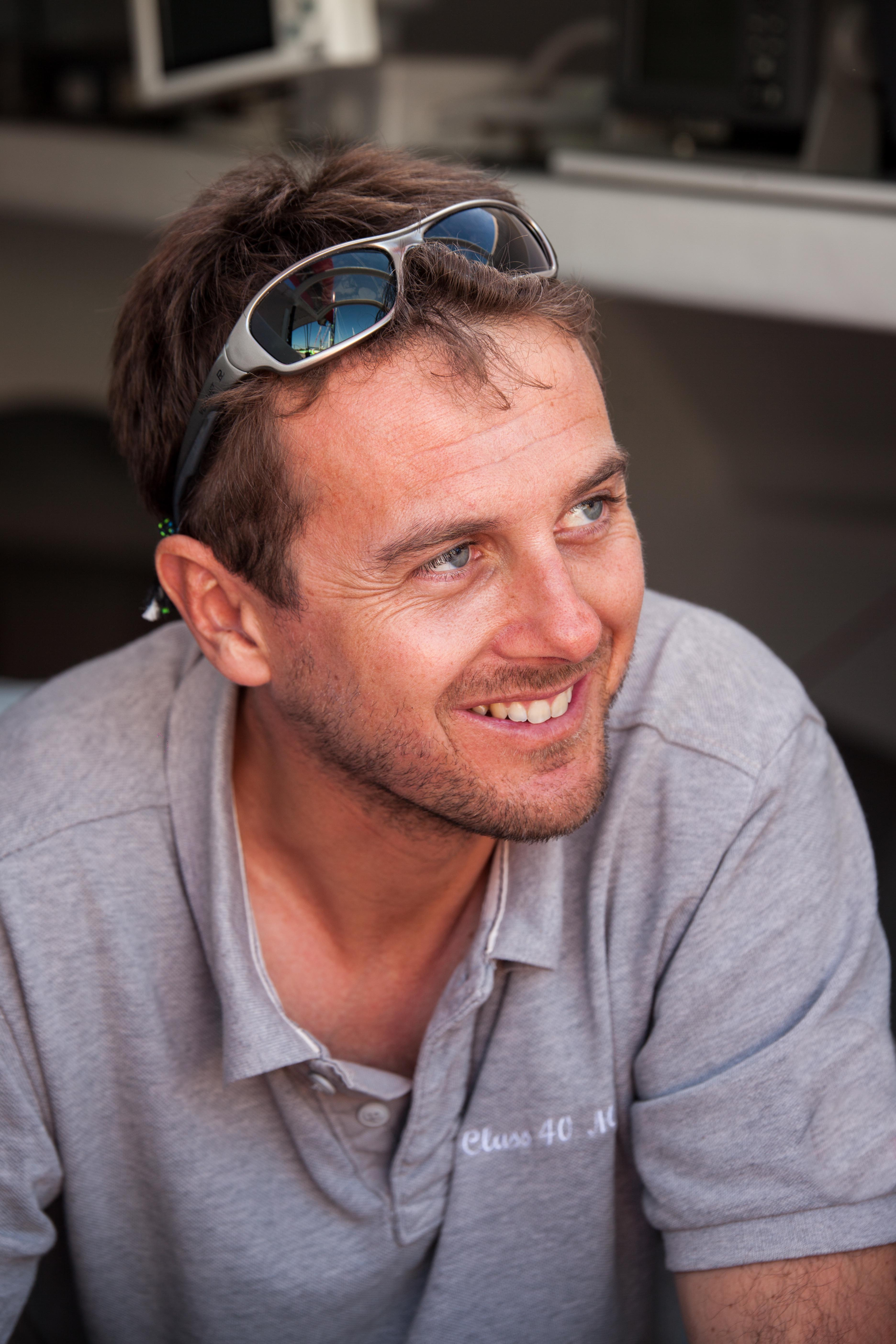

Personal information
- Nationality: French
- Born: 5 June 1976 (age 50) Hennebont

Sailing career
- Sport: Sailing
- Class: IMOCA 60

Stéphane Le Diraison is a French sailor born on 5 June 1976 in Hennebont. He is an offshore sailor and is competing in the 2020–2021 Vendée Globe onboard IMOCA 60 called Time For Oceans.

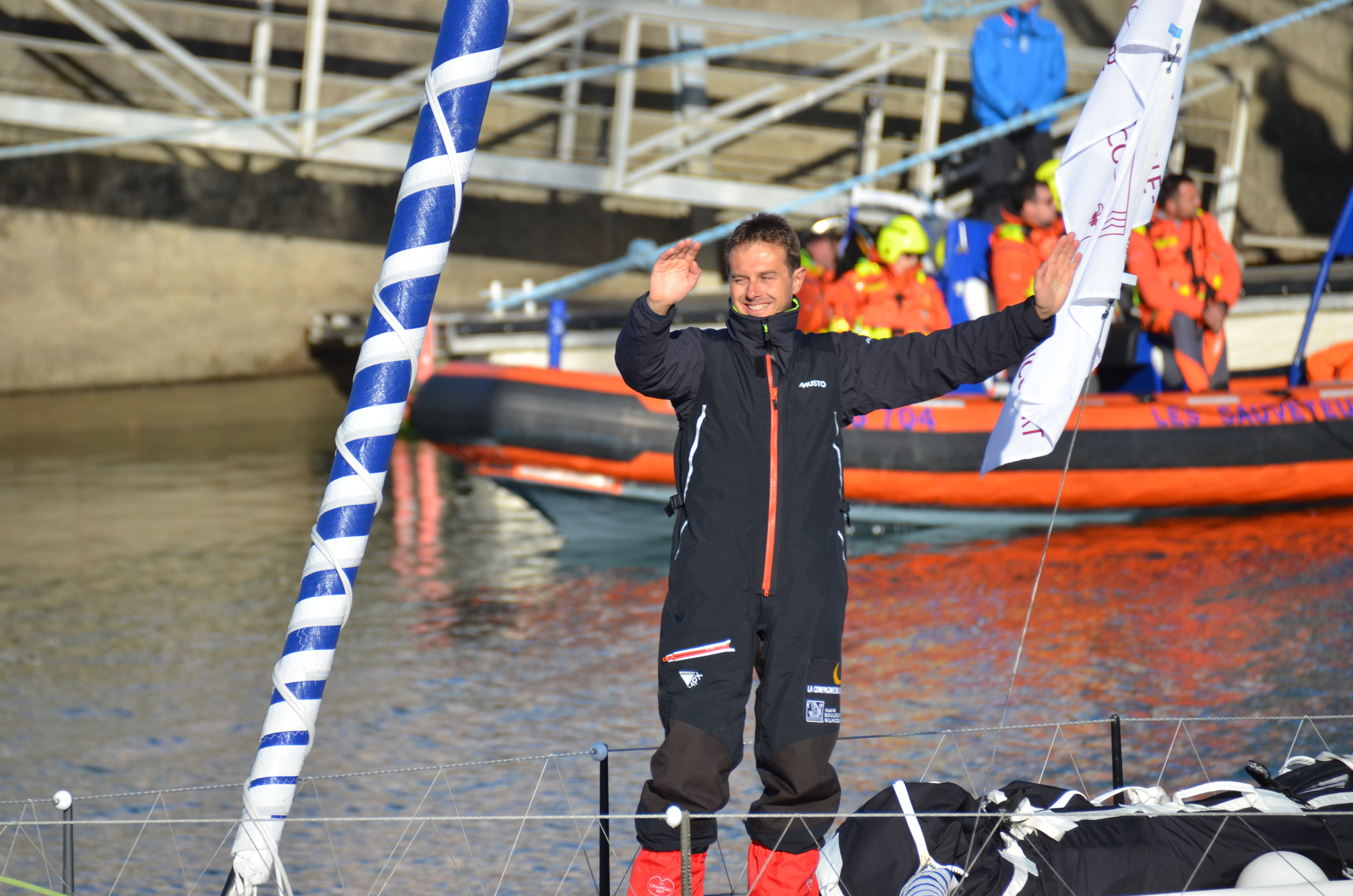

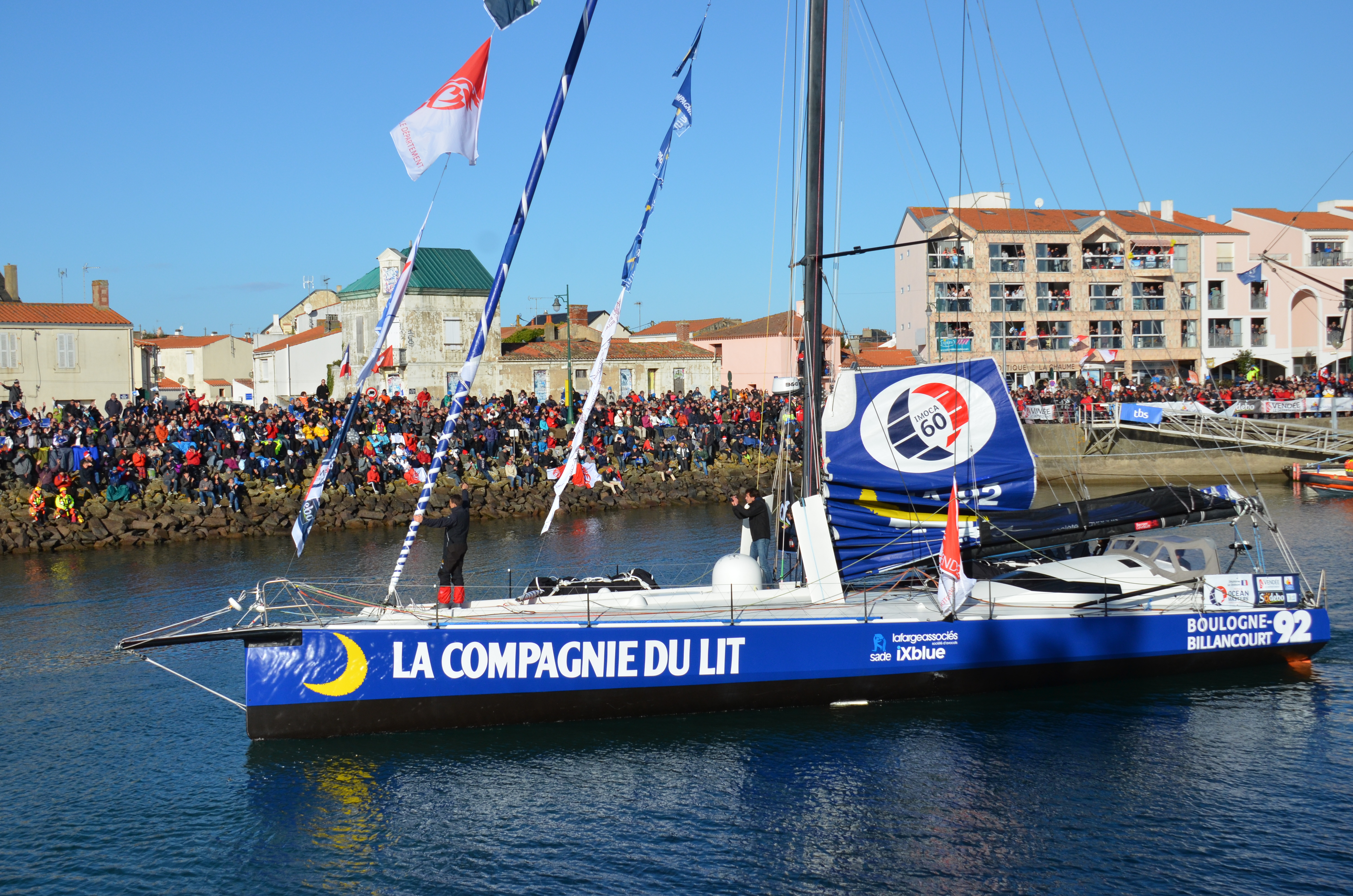

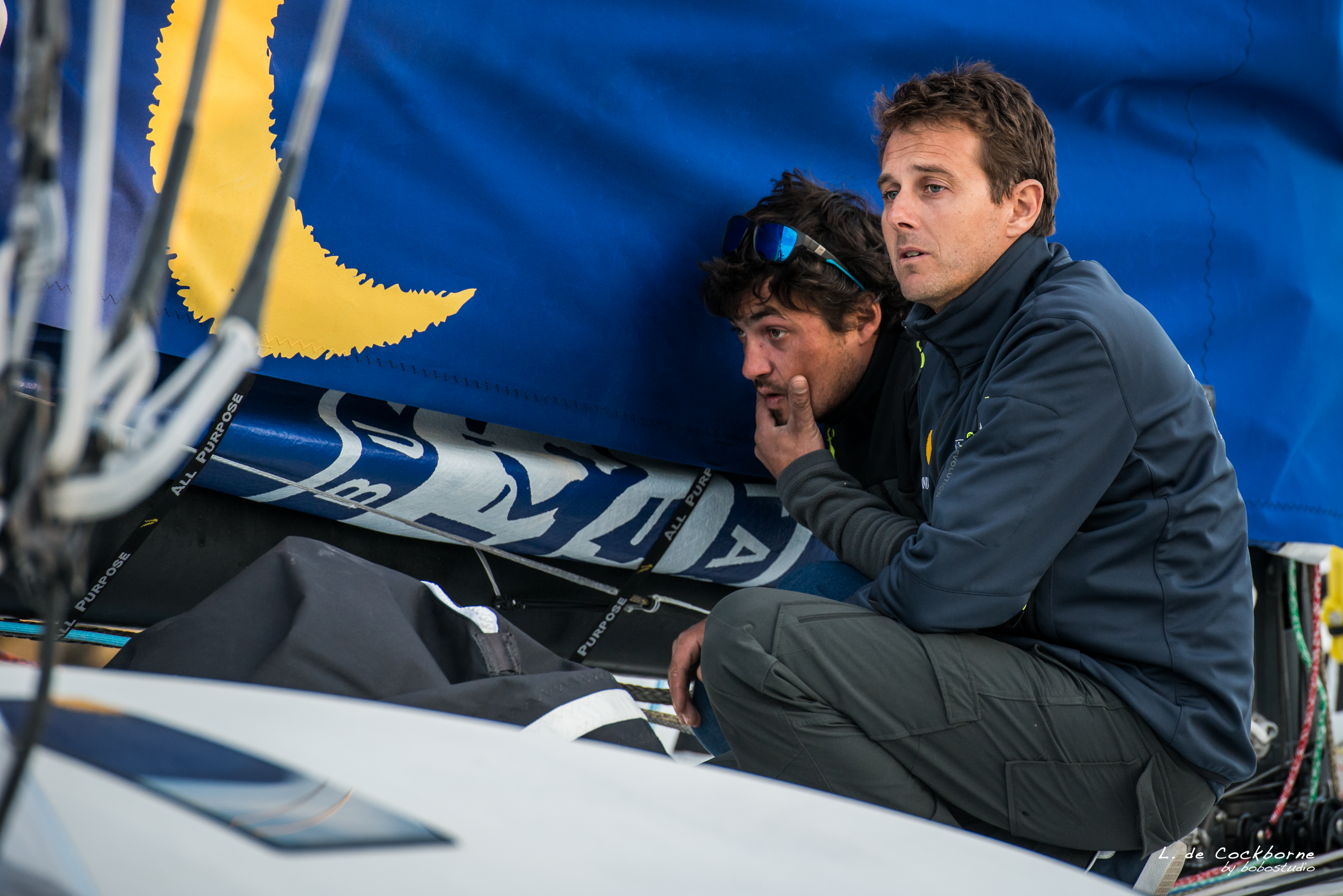

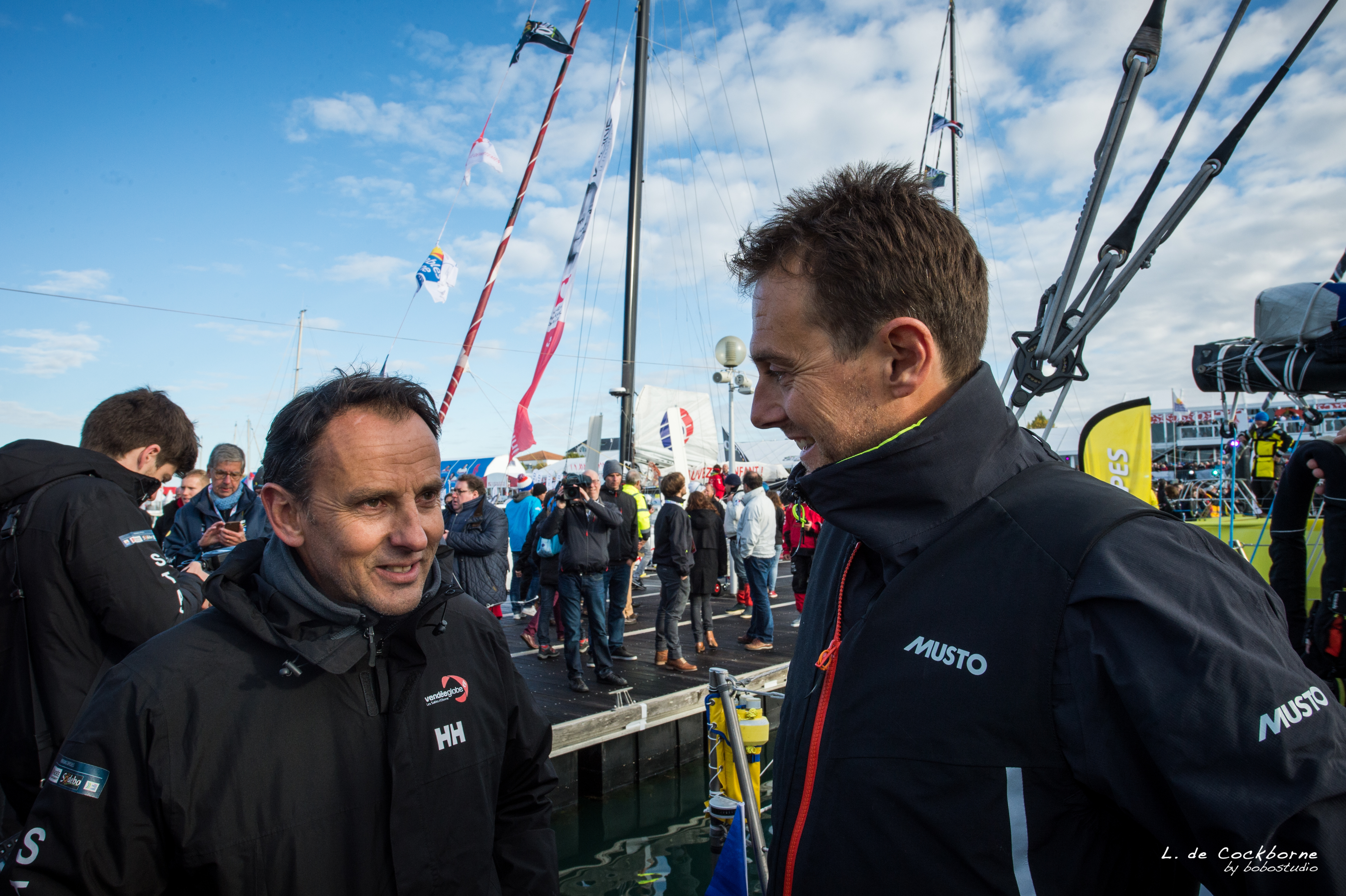
