= Parc botanique de Kerbihan =

Municipal arboretum and botanical garden in Bretagne, France

Coordinates: 47.8060°N 3.2677°W

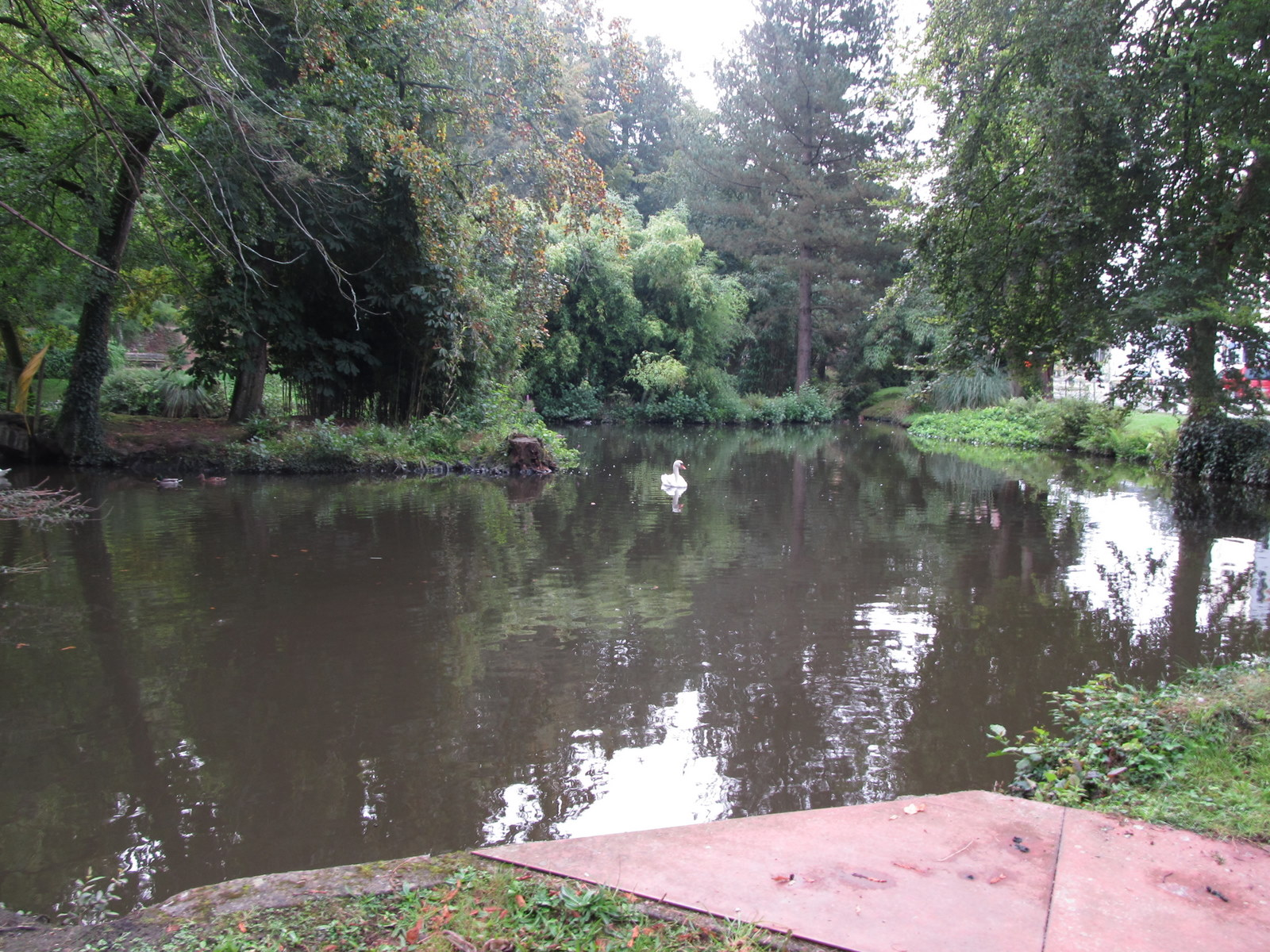
Kerbihan Botanical Park, Hennebont, France

The Parc botanique de Kerbihan (10 hectares), sometimes also called the Arboretum d'Hennebont, is a municipal arboretum and botanical garden located near the Rue Gérard Philipe, Hennebont, Morbihan, Bretagne, France. It is open daily without charge.

The park was created in the late 19th century and restored in the 1960s. Today it contains 130 types of trees from around the world and 400 varieties of shrubs. Of particular interest are its century-old conifers and bamboos, as well as its neoromantic garden, cascades, stream, and pond.

== See also ==
- List of botanical gardens in France
