= Syndicat Mixte =

In France, a Syndicat Mixte is a joint venture between various public authorities of different types. Typically these might include a département together with a communauté d'agglomération or several communes.

The organisations are governed by representatives elected by their member bodies.
