= Hennebont =

Commune in Brittany, France

Hennebont Henbont (Breton)
- Commune
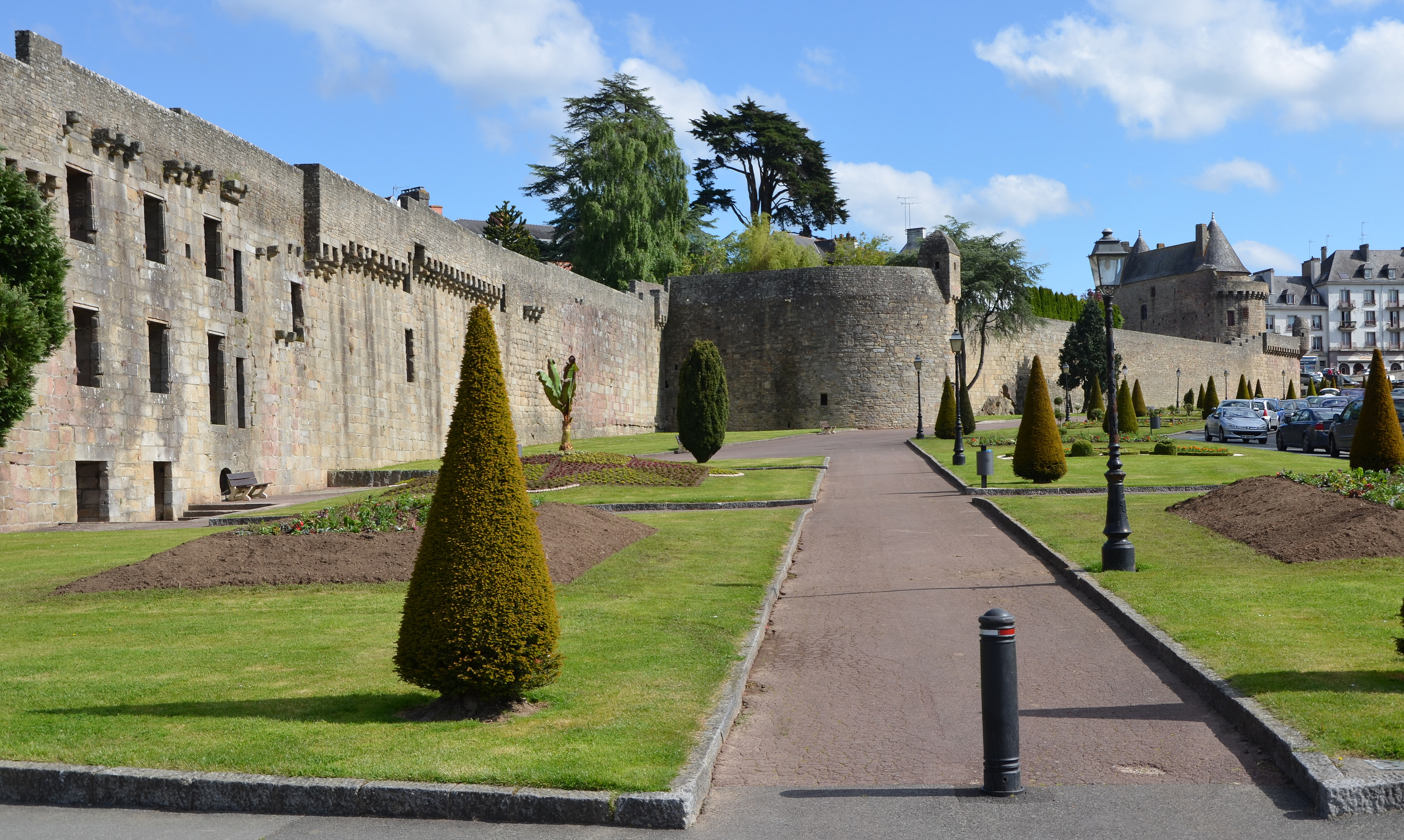
- The medieval ramparts.

- Coat of arms
- Location of Hennebont
- Location within France Location within Brittany
- Coordinates: 47°48′18″N 3°16′39″W
- Country: France
- Region: Brittany
- Department: Morbihan
- Arrondissement: Lorient
- Canton: Hennebont
- Intercommunality: Lorient Agglomération

Government
  - Mayor (2026–32): Jean-Charles Brunet
- Area^{1}: 18.57 km^{2} (7.17 sq mi)
- Elevation: 5 m (16 ft)
- Highest elevation: 82 m (269 ft)
- Lowest elevation: 0 m (0 ft)
- Population (2023): 15,910
  - Density: 856.8/km^{2} (2,219/sq mi)
- Time zone: UTC+01:00 (CET)
  - Summer (DST): UTC+02:00 (CEST)
- INSEE/Postal code: 56083 /56700
- ^{1} French Land Register data, which excludes lakes, ponds, glaciers > 1 km^{2} (0.386 sq mi or 247 acres) and river estuaries.

Hennebont (French pronunciation: [ɛnbɔ̃]; Breton: Henbont) is a commune in the Morbihan department in the region of Brittany in north-western France.

== Geography ==
Hennebont is situated about 16 km (10 mi) from the mouth of the River Blavet, which divides it into two parts: the Ville Close, the medieval walled town, and the 17th century Ville Neuve on the left bank and the oldest site: the Vieille Ville on the right. The old walled town (Ville Close) still has traces of its medieval ramparts dating from the 13th to 15th centuries as well as a large fortified 15th century gatehouse complete with double-doors with drawbridge slots, known as the Porte du Broërec.

== Map ==
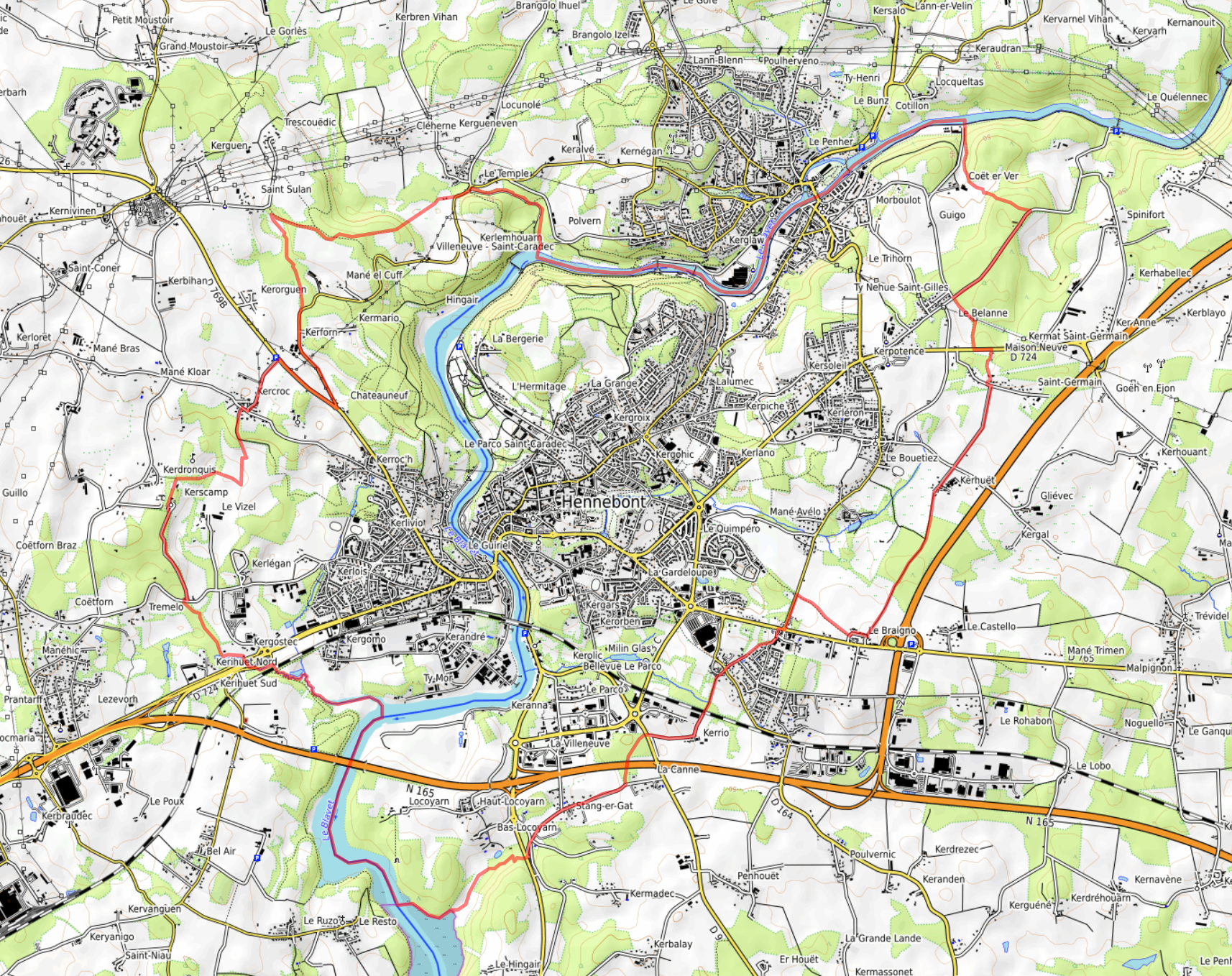
Topographic map

== History ==
=== Breton War of Succession ===
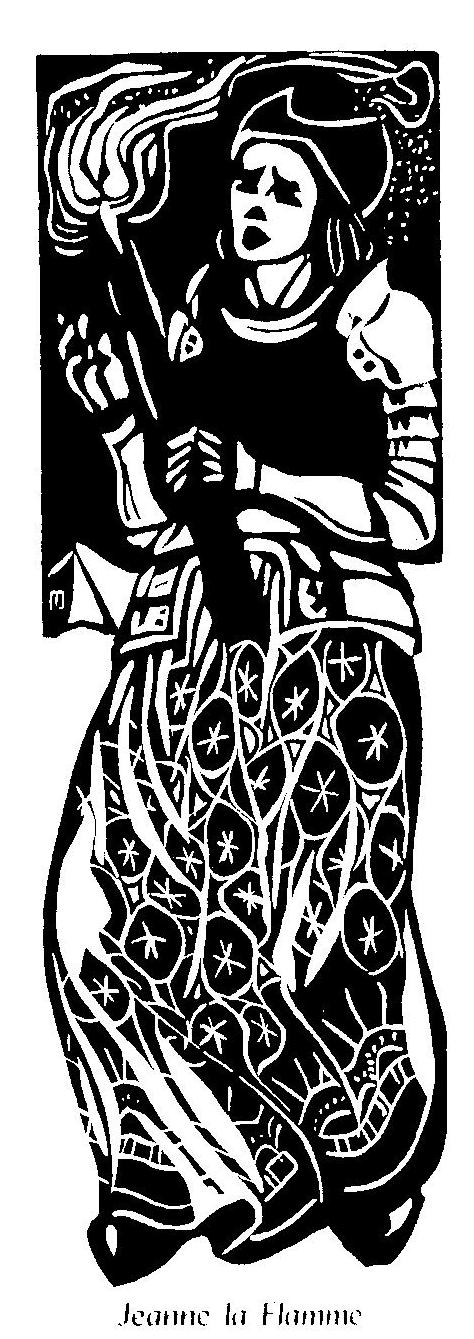
"Jeanne la Flamme" at the siege of Hennebont depicted by Jeanne Malivel

Hennebont is famed for its resistance, under Joanna of Flanders, the widow of Jean de Montfort, to the armies of Philip of Valois and Charles of Blois when besieged in 1342 during the War of the Breton Succession. A century before Joan of Arc, Jeanne dressed herself in armor and led the resistance to the besiegers. She personally led an attack on the enemy camp, setting fire to it and earned the nickname "Jeanne la Flamme" ("Joan the Fiery").

==== The other Jeanne of Hennebont ====
Hennebont is also the final home of Jeanne de Clisson, the Lioness of Brittany.

=== World War II ===
In August 1944, during the Allied invasion of Brittany, a large section of the old walled town, especially the ramparts, towers and medieval buildings, sustained major damage during the bombing of German positions entrenched in the downtown area.

== Points of interest ==
- Parc botanique de Kerbihan

== Demographics ==
Inhabitants of Hennebont are called Hennebontais. In 2008, 5.45% of the children of Hennebont attended bilingual primary schools.

Historical population

Year	Pop.	±% p.a.
1793	5,338	—
1800	4,847	−1.37%
1806	4,678	−0.59%
1821	4,887	+0.29%
1831	4,477	−0.87%
1836	4,749	+1.19%
1841	4,552	−0.84%
1846	4,668	+0.50%
1851	4,710	+0.18%
1856	4,755	+0.19%
1861	4,675	−0.34%
1866	5,112	+1.80%
1872	5,498	+1.22%
1876	6,050	+2.42%
1881	5,988	−0.21%
1886	6,519	+1.71%
1891	6,972	+1.35%
1896	8,074	+2.98%
1901	8,702	+1.51%

Year	Pop.	±% p.a.
1906	9,121	+0.94%
1911	8,605	−1.16%
1921	8,682	+0.09%
1926	8,297	−0.90%
1931	8,148	−0.36%
1936	8,690	+1.30%
1946	8,217	−0.56%
1954	11,279	+4.04%
1962	11,690	+0.45%
1968	11,799	+0.15%
1975	12,273	+0.56%
1982	12,963	+0.78%
1990	13,624	+0.62%
1999	13,412	−0.17%
2007	14,233	+0.75%
2012	15,779	+2.08%
2017	15,678	−0.13%
2023	15,910	+0.25%

Source: EHESS and INSEE (1968-2023)

== Twin towns ==
Hennebont is twinned with:

- Kronach, Bavaria, Germany
- Mourdiah, Mali
- Mumbles, Wales, United Kingdom
- Halhul, Palestine

== Notable people ==
- Prince Pierre, Duke of Valentinois, was born at the Château de Kerscamp, Hennebont
- Warren Barguil, professional cyclist
- Anthony Le Tallec, footballer
- Jeanne de Clisson, Corsair died in Hennebont

== See also ==
- Communes of the Morbihan department
- Haras National d'Hennebont

== Sports ==
=== Soccer ===
Hennebont has three soccer clubs:

- The Entente Saint Gilloise d'Hennebont (ESG), created in 1976, is a friendly neighborhood club of the same name (St Gilles) which has wished to keep its independence. The colors of this club are green and black and offers teams in all age categories (from U7 via its soccer school). The flagship team plays in D2 since the 2020/21 season. The club has also made news by opening a fund to try to recruit Lionel Messi in September 2020. On 29 September 2021 the club announced the creation of its 1st 100% female team and thus participates in the U13F and U11F championship of the Morbihan district.
- The Stade Hennebontais born in 2017 from the merger of two clubs in the city: the Union Sportive Hennebontaise (USH) and the Garde du Vœu (GVH). The first sports season ends on good results with the rise in D2 of the A team. In July 2020, the team reaches the D1 following the withdrawal of two clubs, the district having drafted the SH among the best 3rd, to evolve in this division during the season 2020/21, but goes down in D2, where the club will evolve from the season 2022/23.
- The Association Sportive Kergroix (ASK), as a leisure club, has only one veterans' team.

In 2015, the clubs of GVH and ESG tried to form a youth group called Hennebont FC but the project did not succeed.

=== Table tennis ===
The Garde du Vœu Hennebont table tennis team won the French championship title in 2005, 2006, 2007 and 2009 and is regularly qualified to play in the Champions League or ETTU. The Abraham hall is known to be the most lively in France, with each match filling it.

In 2019, Hennebont wins its first European title, the ETTU Cup.

A new international table tennis training, coaching and competition center is expected to be built by the end of 2020.

=== Basketball ===
The Basket Club Hennebontais (BCH), which plays in the National 3 Men's league, aims to reach the National 2 in 2024 (ADN 2024 project).

=== Handball ===
Hennebont Lochrist Handball will play in the National 1 Men's division (3rd division) from the 2022/23 season, following the first place obtained during the 2021/22 season in the National 2 division, after having won its last championship game against Cherbourg, and finishing undefeated at home during this season. The flagship team plays in Kerlano but will move to Inzinzac-Lochrist, within a new sports complex on the site of Mané-Braz, in order to be able to accommodate more spectators, in 2024.

=== Chess ===
L'Échiquier Hennebontais plays in Division 1, after having played in National 4. The club also trains young people (girls and boys) in their learning of the discipline, and also has a team present in D2 Jeunes. At the approach of the end of the year celebrations, the club also organizes a Christmas tournament, in fast configuration (7 rounds of 15 minutes per player), 2 tournaments are organized in reality: one for the young people and a second one for the adults and the experienced young people.
