= First Treaty of London =

1358 treaty between England and France

- Type: Treaty of perpetual peace
- Context: Hundred Years' War
- Drafted: October 1357 – May 1358
- Location: Windsor Castle, England
- Sealed: 8 May 1358
- Effective: 8 May 1358
- Negotiators: John II of France; Edward III of England
- Signatories: John II of France; Edward III of England
- Parties: Kingdom of England; Kingdom of France

The First Treaty of London, also known as the Treaty of Windsor, was formally agreed on 8 May 1358 at Windsor Castle in England. It aimed to end the then 21-year-old Anglo-French conflict now known as the Hundred Years' War. It was sealed by Kings Edward III of England and John II of France; the latter was a prisoner in England, having been captured with much of his council at the Battle of Poitiers in 1356.

The treaty set John's ransom at four million écus (£667,000) – the equivalent of the peacetime income of the English Crown for about 20 years. In exchange for peace, France was to transfer to England approximately a quarter of its territory; Edward would give up his claim to the French throne. The first instalment of the ransom – 600,000 écus (£100,000) – was due to be paid on 1 November, but with the French government collapsing into insurrection and anarchy it proved impossible to raise the sum. Edward refused to accept less than full performance of the terms of the treaty and it lapsed. Subsequent negotiations led to the Second Treaty of London in March 1359, but its terms were so harsh that the French government repudiated it. Hostilities resumed in October, when Edward again invaded France.

== Background ==
Since the Norman Conquest of 1066, English monarchs had held titles and lands within France, the possession of which made them vassals of the kings of France. By the first quarter of the fourteenth century, the only sizeable French possession still held by the English in France was Gascony in the south west. But Gascony was disproportionately important: duty levied by the English Crown on wine from Bordeaux in Gascony totalled more than all other English customs duties combined and was by far the largest source of state income. Following a series of disagreements between Philip VI of France and Edward III of England, on 24 May 1337 Philip's Great Council agreed that the lands held by Edward III in France should be taken back into Philip's hands on the grounds that Edward was in breach of his obligations as a vassal. This marked the start of the Hundred Years' War, which was to last 116 years.

France in 1328: English-controlled Gascony is shown in blue in the south west

After ten years of fierce but sporadic fighting, the Truce of Calais was signed in September 1347, partly as a result of both countries being financially exhausted. The same year the Black Death reached northern France and southern England. It is estimated to have killed a third of the population of Western Europe; the death rate was over 40 per cent in southern England. This catastrophe temporarily halted the fighting, with the Truce of Calais being repeatedly extended. This did not stop ongoing naval clashes, nor small-scale fighting – which was especially fierce in south-west France – nor occasional fighting on a larger scale.

The Treaty of Guînes, which would have ended the war, was signed on 6 April 1354. However, the composition of the inner council of the new French king, John II, changed and French sentiment turned against its terms. John decided not to ratify it, and it was clear that from the summer of 1355 both sides would be committed to full-scale war. In April 1355 Edward III and his council, with the treasury in an unusually favourable financial position, decided to launch offensives that year in both northern France and Gascony. John attempted to strongly garrison his northern towns and fortifications against the expected descent by Edward III, at the same time as assembling a field army; he was unable to, largely because of a lack of money.

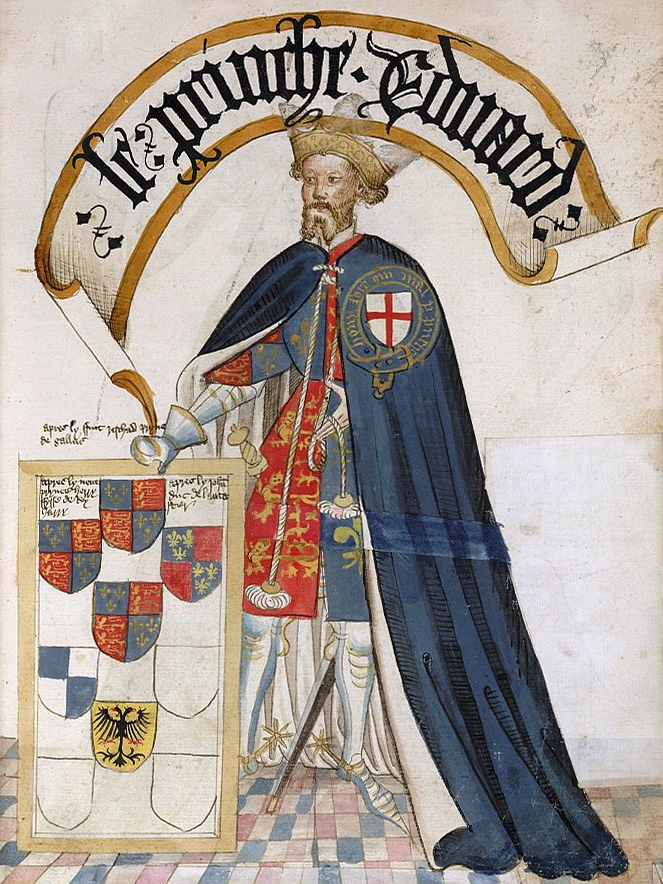
Edward, the Black Prince

Edward III's eldest son, Edward of Woodstock, referred to by historians as the Black Prince, was given the Gascon command. From October he led a two-month-long chevauchée – a large-scale mounted raid – by 5,000 men 300 miles (480 km) into southern France and back. The Anglo-Gascon force devastated a wide swathe of French territory, sacking many French towns, while facing almost no armed resistance. On 4 August 1356 the Black Prince commenced another chevauchée, leading 6,000 Anglo-Gascon soldiers north from Bergerac towards Bourges, leaving a trail of death and burning towns on the way. John mustered the largest army he could and attempted to bring the Black Prince to battle. By early September the Anglo-Gascons were withdrawing towards Gascony in the face of this much larger force. The French succeeded in cutting off the prince's army, and initiated the Battle of Poitiers by attacking the English in their prepared defensive position, partly from fear they might slip away, but mostly as a question of honour.

Between 14,000 and 16,000 French troops, including at least 10,000 men-at-arms, (Note: Men-at-arms were, broadly, knights or knights in training. They were drawn from the landed gentry and ranged from great lords to the relatives and attendants of minor landowners. They needed to be able to equip themselves with a full suit of plate armour and a war horse.) attacked on the morning of 19 September in four separate waves. The Anglo-Gascons defeated each in turn during a long-drawn-out battle. They partially surrounded the final French attack and captured the French king and one of his sons. In total, 5,800 Frenchmen were killed and 2,000 to 3,000 men-at-arms captured. In the aftermath of the battle English and Gascon forces raided widely across France, against little or no opposition. With no effective central authority, France dissolved into near anarchy. On 22 March 1357 John and the Black Prince agreed a truce between France and England at Bordeaux, to last until 19 April 1359. In April 1357 the pair sailed for England, entering London to a rapturous reception.

== Negotiations ==
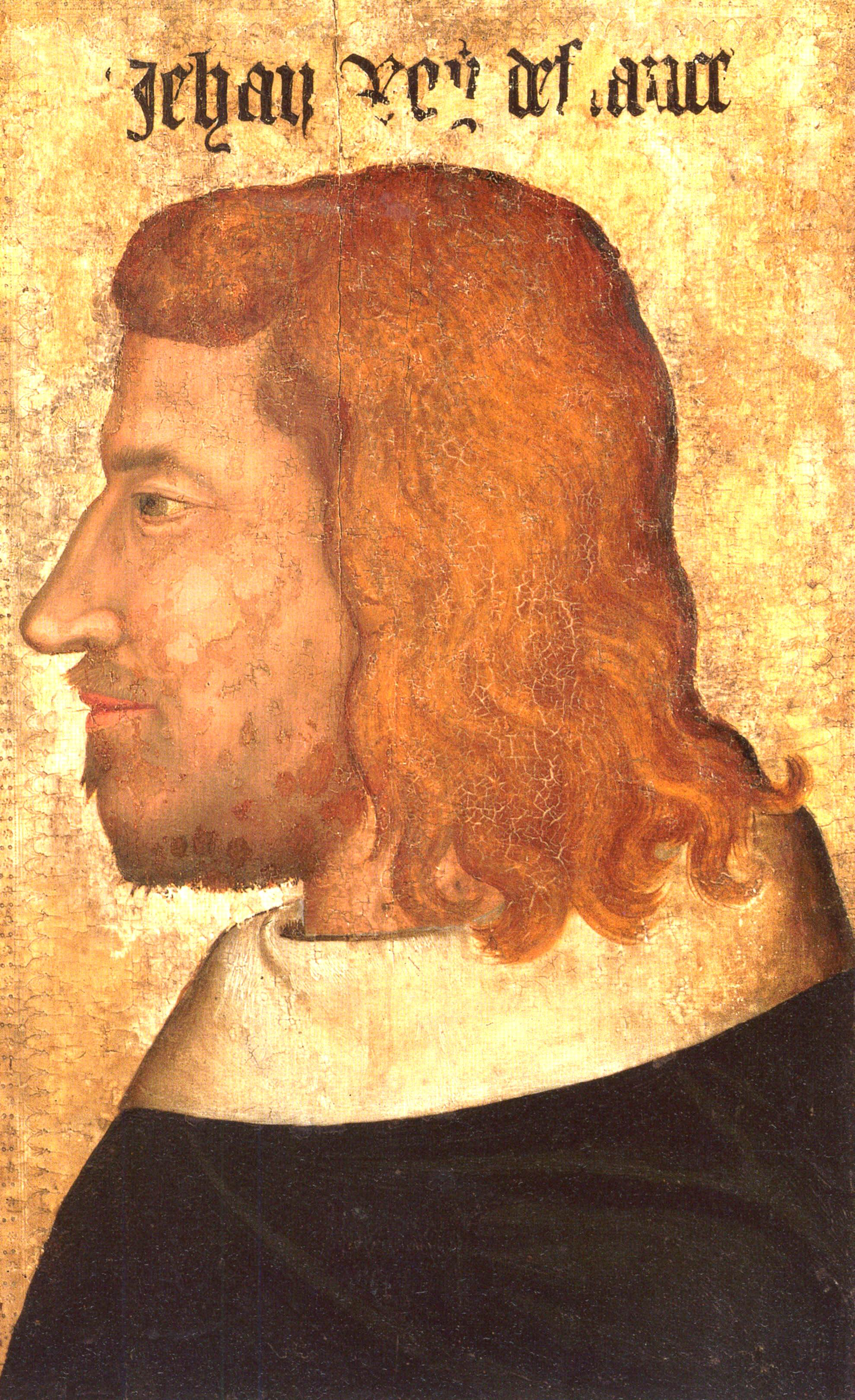
Contemporary image of John II

Negotiations to both end the war and agree a ransom for the French king began between the royal councils of John and Edward III in October 1357; most of the French Great Council were in London, having been captured by the English. The starting point for negotiations was the final draft of the Treaty of Guînes, but little was agreed until November, when news arrived that the King of Navarre, known as Charles the Bad, had escaped from his French prison cell. Charles had a strong claim to the French throne and had repeatedly negotiated with the English, had plotted to kidnap John, and in 1354 had murdered the constable of France, one of John's closest advisers, in his bedroom, and boasted of it. In April 1356 he had been dining with colleagues at the table of John's eldest son (the Dauphin), Charles, when John arrived accompanied by armed men and arrested ten of the most outspoken diners; four were summarily executed, and the others, including Charles the Bad, were imprisoned.

John, believing correctly that Charles would raise an army against the Crown, now felt compelled to be back on his throne so he could attempt to control the situation; Edward felt this was the moment at which he could obtain the best deal. In John's absence France was proving ungovernable. Charles the Dauphin was the regent, but had so little control that in February 1358 two of his senior advisers were murdered in his presence in Paris. Also in February, the French national assembly, the Estates General, fearing what John might agree to, attempted to prohibit him from negotiating with Edward.

To add to the pressure on the French, in October 1357 the Treaty of Berwick was sealed between England and Scotland. This ended the Anglo-Scottish war, fudged the issue of English suzerainty and freed the captured Scottish king, David II, for a ransom of £67,000, to be paid in instalments over ten years. English men and resources previously needed to hold the Scots in check could now be used in France.

By early 1358 the English and French negotiators had agreed that John's personal ransom would be the huge amount of four million écus. This was £667,000, which was the equivalent of the peacetime income of the English Crown for about 20 years. John was not to be released until an initial payment of 600,000 écus (£100,000) was paid; according to the treaty this was to be received on 1 November. The balance was to be paid in annual instalments for an unspecified period. With regard to a territorial settlement, the final terms were less harsh for France than those incorporated in the never-ratified Treaty of Guînes. (Note: The main difference was that the new treaty excluded the provinces of the western Loire which had been ceded to England by the Treaty of Guînes.) A quarter of France was to be transferred to England to become its sovereign territory. Nearly all of this was in the south west – Aquitaine, Saintonge, Poitou, Angoumois, Périgord, Agenais, Limousin, Rouergue, Quercy, Bigorre, Gaure – but also included Ponthieu, Montreuil, the Pale of Calais, and parts of Normandy.

There were other provisions, mostly concerning France's internal affairs, such as France abandoning its long-standing alliance with Scotland and a mechanism for ending the Breton Civil War. Several issues were only agreed in draft so as to speed the process of generating the main agreement – details were to be settled later. Almost all of the senior nobility of France were to be held in England as hostages for compliance with the terms of the treaty, along with two of the more important burghers from each of 20 principal French towns. In exchange the war would be ended and Edward would give up his and his descendants' claim to the French throne. Edward insisted that the agreement be so structured that if any of its terms were not fulfilled, the entire treaty lapsed.

It was made public that an agreement had been reached, but the terms were not disclosed. John undertook a campaign to prepare his subjects for the details of the treaty, which he was aware would be unpopular. Edward assisted by releasing four senior French prisoners on parole so they could travel to Paris and commend the agreement to the Dauphin and the main parties making up the Estates General. The draft treaty was received sympathetically by them and ratified by the Dauphin. The treaty was formally sealed by John and Edward on 8 May 1358 at Windsor Castle. John and Edward kissed each other and exchanged rings to demonstrate their new-found amity.

== Outcome ==
French opinion was strongly against the treaty from the start, and between its sealing and the date on which the first tranche of John's ransom was due the calamitous situation in France grew worse. An unaffiliated army of unemployed soldiers and freebooters, known as routiers, cut a swathe of destruction through the Seine valley; Charles the Bad, backed by armed force, continued to manoeuvre to seize the French throne; a savage peasant uprising, the Jacquerie, broke out against the established order; the Dauphin had to leave Paris, although he returned in July and laid siege to the city. Raising the money to secure John's freedom was impossible. The French were not even able to arrange for the hostages who were named in the treaty to be in London by November. Brooking no excuses, on 20 November 1358 Edward declared that the treaty had lapsed and that fighting would recommence once the truce expired in April.

Before the end of 1358, instructions had gone out to muster a large army and a commensurate fleet for the following year. By the start of 1359 the English were gathering materiel in preparation for another round of campaigning and it had been agreed to invade northern France. In despair, in February John negotiated face to face with Edward and they rapidly came to a revised agreement, the Second Treaty of London. The ransom sum remained the same, but John was to cede almost half of France in full sovereignty to England. This treaty was sealed on 24 March. There was an outcry against it in France when the details became known, and the Dauphin refused to ratify it. Edward therefore reinstated the plans to mobilise the English army and invade France.

== Aftermath ==
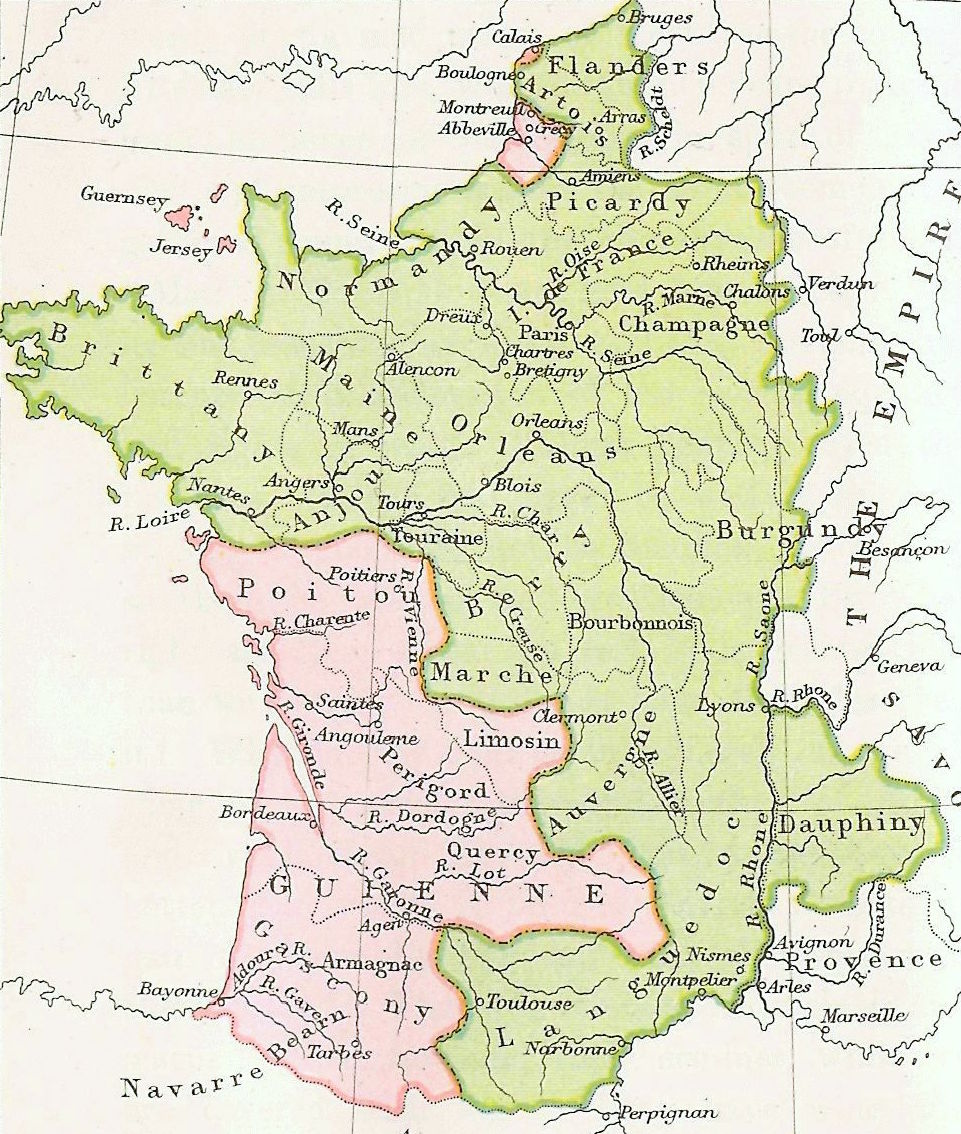
France after the 1360 Treaty of Brétigny; French territory in green, English territory in pink

In October 1359 Edward III led a campaign in northern France. It was unopposed by French field forces but was unable to take any strongly fortified places. Instead the English army spread out and for six months devastated much of the region. Both countries were finding it almost impossible to finance continued hostilities, but neither was inclined to change their attitude to the proposed peace terms. On 13 April 1360, near Chartres, a sharp fall in temperature and a heavy hailstorm killed many English baggage horses and some soldiers. Taking this as a sign from God, Edward reopened negotiations, directly with the Dauphin. By 8 May the Treaty of Brétigny had been agreed, which largely replicated the First Treaty of London or the Treaty of Guînes.

By this treaty, vast areas of France were ceded to England, to be personally ruled by the Black Prince as the Prince of Aquitaine and Gascony, and John was ransomed for three million écus. As well as John, sixteen of the more senior nobles captured at Poitiers were finally released with the sealing of this treaty. At the time it seemed this was the end of the war, but large-scale fighting broke out again in 1369 and the Hundred Years' War did not end until 1453, with a French victory which left only Calais in English hands.

== Notes, citations and sources ==
=== Sources ===
- Burne, Alfred (1999) [1955]. The Crecy War. Ware, Hertfordshire: Wordsworth Editions. ISBN 978-1-84022-210-4.
- Curry, Anne (2002). The Hundred Years' War 1337–1453. Oxford: Osprey Publishing. ISBN 978-1-84176-269-2.
- Deaux, George (1969). The Black Death, 1347. London: Hamilton. OCLC 242352826.
- Given-Wilson, Chris & Bériac, Françoise (2001). "Edward III's Prisoners of War: The Battle of Poitiers and its Context". The English Historical Review. 112 (468): 802–833. doi:10.1093/ehr/CXVI.468.802. ISSN 0013-8266. JSTOR 579193.
- Green, David (2011). The Black Prince. New York: History Press. ISBN 978-0-7524-7306-2.
- Harari, Yuval N. (2007). Special Operations in the Age of Chivalry, 1100–1550. Woodbridge, Suffolk: Boydell Press. ISBN 978-1-84383-292-8.
- Hoskins, Peter (2011). In the Steps of the Black Prince: The Road to Poitiers, 1355–1356. Woodbridge, Suffolk: Boydell. ISBN 978-1-84383-611-7.
- Livingstone, Marilyn & Witzel, Morgen (2018). The Black Prince and the Capture of a King, Poitiers 1356. Oxford; Havertown, Pennsylvania: Casemate. ISBN 978-1-61200-452-5.
- Madden, Mollie (2018). The Black Prince and the Grande Chevauchée of 1355. Woodbridge, Suffolk: Boydell. ISBN 978-1-78327-356-0.
- Mortimer, Ian (2007). The Perfect King: The Life of Edward III, Father of the English Nation. London: Pimlico. ISBN 978-1-84413-530-1.
- Ormrod, W. M. (1990). The Reign of Edward III: Crown and Political Society in England 1327–1377. New Haven; London: Yale. ISBN 978-0-300-04875-9.
- Penman, Michael (2004). David II. East Linton, East Lothian: Tuckwell Press. ISBN 978-1-8623-2202-8.
- Prestwich, M. (1980). The Three Edwards: War and State in England, 1272–1377. Fakenham: Weidenfeld & Nicolson. ISBN 978-0-29777-730-4.
- Rodger, N. A. M. (2004). The Safeguard of the Sea. London: Penguin. ISBN 978-0-14-029724-9.
- Rogers, Clifford J. (1994). "Edward III and the Dialectics of Strategy, 1327–1360". Transactions of the Royal Historical Society. 4: 83–102. doi:10.2307/3679216. JSTOR 3679216. OCLC 931311378. S2CID 163041276.
- Rogers, Clifford J. (2001). "The Anglo-French Peace Negotiations of 1354–1360 Reconsidered". In Bothwell, J. S. (ed.). The Age of Edward III. Woodbridge, Suffolk: York Medieval Press. pp. 193–214. ISBN 978-1-903153-06-2.
- Rogers, Clifford J. (2014) [2000]. War Cruel and Sharp: English Strategy under Edward III, 1327–1360. Woodbridge, Suffolk: Boydell Press. ISBN 978-0-85115-804-4.
- Sumption, Jonathan (1990). Trial by Battle. The Hundred Years' War. Vol. I. London: Faber and Faber. ISBN 978-0-571-20095-5.
- Sumption, Jonathan (1999). Trial by Fire. The Hundred Years' War. Vol. II. London: Faber and Faber. ISBN 978-0-571-13896-8.
- Wagner, John A. (2006). Encyclopedia of the Hundred Years War. Woodbridge, Suffolk: Greenwood. ISBN 978-0-313-32736-0.
