= Second Treaty of London =

1359 treaty between England and France

- Type: Treaty of perpetual peace
- Context: Hundred Years' War
- Drafted: March 1359
- Location: London, England
- Sealed: 24 March 1359
- Effective: Not ratified
- Negotiators: John II, king of France; Edward III, king of England
- Signatories: John II, king of France; Edward III, king of England
- Parties: Kingdom of England; Kingdom of France

The Second Treaty of London was formally agreed on 24 March 1359 in London, England. Its terms would have ended the then 22-year-old Anglo-French conflict now known as the Hundred Years' War. It was sealed by Edward III, king of England, and John II, king of France; the latter was a prisoner in England, having been captured with much of his council at the battle of Poitiers in 1356.

An agreement was negotiated in 1358 to end the war – the First Treaty of London. Its main terms set John's ransom at four million écus: this was £667,000 – the equivalent of the entire peacetime income of the English Crown for about 20 years – and France was to transfer to England approximately a quarter of its territory, while Edward would give up his claim to the French throne. The first installment of the ransom – 600,000 écus (£100,000) – was due to be paid on 1 November 1358, but with the French government collapsing into insurrection and anarchy, it proved impossible to raise, and Edward declared that the agreement had lapsed.

Desperate to be back in France, which was proving ungovernable in his absence, in March 1359 John rapidly negotiated the Second Treaty of London. This had similar terms to the previous treaty, except the amount of territory to be ceded to England was increased to nearly half of France. When the details became known, there was an outcry in France, and the Dauphin, who was acting as the regent while John was a captive, refused to ratify it. In retaliation Edward mobilised the English army. Hostilities resumed in October when the English again invaded France, and ended on 8 May 1360 when the Treaty of Brétigny was agreed.

== Background ==
Since the Norman Conquest of 1066, English monarchs had held titles and lands within France, the possession of which made them vassals of the kings of France. By the first quarter of the fourteenth century, the only significant French possession still held by the English in France was Gascony in the south west. But Gascony was disproportionately important: duty levied by the English Crown on wine from Bordeaux in Gascony totalled more than all other English customs duties combined and was by far the largest source of state income. Following a series of disagreements between Philip VI of France and Edward III of England, on 24 May 1337 Philip's Great Council agreed that the lands held by Edward III in France should be taken back into Philip's hands on the grounds that Edward was in breach of his obligations as a vassal. This marked the start of the Hundred Years' War, which was to last 116 years.

France in 1328: English-controlled Gascony is shown in blue in the south west

After ten years of fierce but sporadic fighting the Truce of Calais was signed in September 1347, partially as a result of both countries being financially exhausted. The same year the Black Death reached northern France and southern England. It is estimated to have killed a third of the population of Western Europe; the death rate was more than 40% in southern England. This catastrophe temporarily halted the fighting, with the Truce of Calais repeatedly extended. This did not stop ongoing naval clashes, nor small-scale fighting – which was especially fierce in south-west France – nor occasional fighting on a larger scale.

The Treaty of Guînes, which would have ended the war, was signed on 6 April 1354. However, the composition of the inner council of the new French king, John II, changed and French sentiment turned against its terms. John decided not to ratify it, and it was clear that from the summer of 1355, when the last extension of the truce ended, both sides would be committed to full-scale war. In April 1355 Edward III and his council, with the treasury in an unusually favourable financial position, decided to launch offensives that year in both northern France and Gascony. John attempted to strongly garrison his northern towns and fortifications against the expected descent by Edward III, at the same time as assembling a field army; he was unable to, largely because of a lack of money.

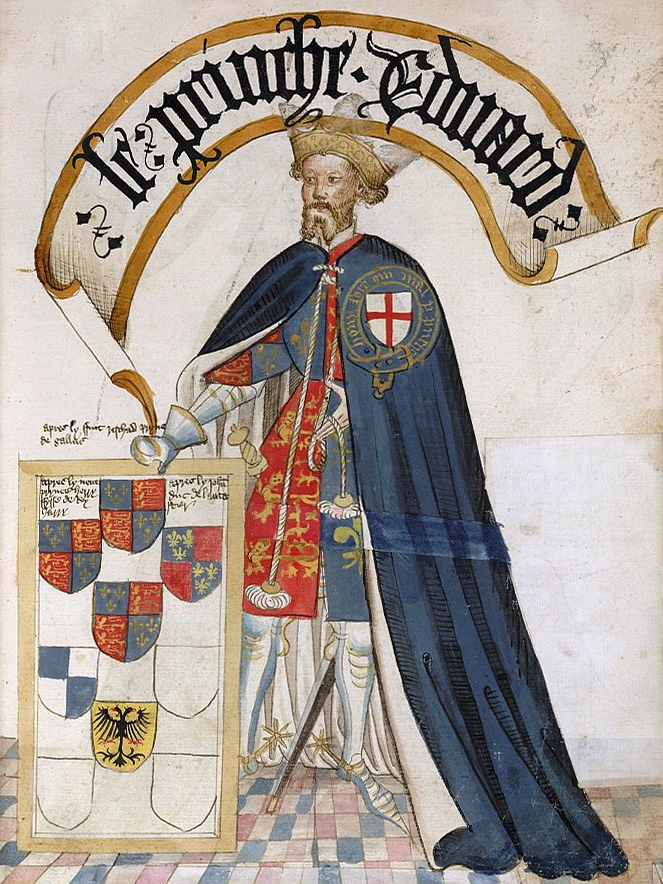
Edward, the Black Prince

Edward III's eldest son, Edward of Woodstock, later known as the Black Prince, was given the Gascon command and in August 1356 commenced a chevauchée, which was a large-scale mounted raid. Some 6,000 Anglo-Gascon soldiers headed north from Bergerac towards Bourges, leaving a trail of death and burning French towns in their wake. By early September the Anglo-Gascons were facing a much larger French royal army and the Black Prince withdrew towards Gascony. The French succeeded in cutting off the Prince's army, and attacked it in its prepared defensive position, partly from fear it might slip away, but mostly as a question of honour. This was the Battle of Poitiers.

Between 14,000 and 16,000 French troops, including at least 10,000 men-at-arms, (Note: Men-at-arms were, broadly, knights or knights in training. They were drawn from the landed gentry and ranged from great lords to the relatives and attendants of minor landowners. They needed to be able to equip themselves with a full suit of plate armour and chain mail, and a war horse.) attacked on the morning of 19 September in four separate waves. The Anglo-Gascons defeated each in turn during a long-drawn-out battle. They partially surrounded the final French attack and captured the French King and one of his sons. In total 5,800 Frenchmen were killed and 2,000 to 3,000 men-at-arms captured. The surviving French dispersed while the Anglo-Gascons continued their withdrawal to Gascony. In the aftermath of the battle English and Gascon forces raided widely across France, against little or no opposition. With no effective central authority France dissolved into near anarchy. On 22 March 1357 John and the Black Prince agreed a truce between France and England at Bordeaux, to last until 19 April 1359. In April 1357 the pair sailed for England, entering London to a rapturous reception.

== First Treaty of London ==
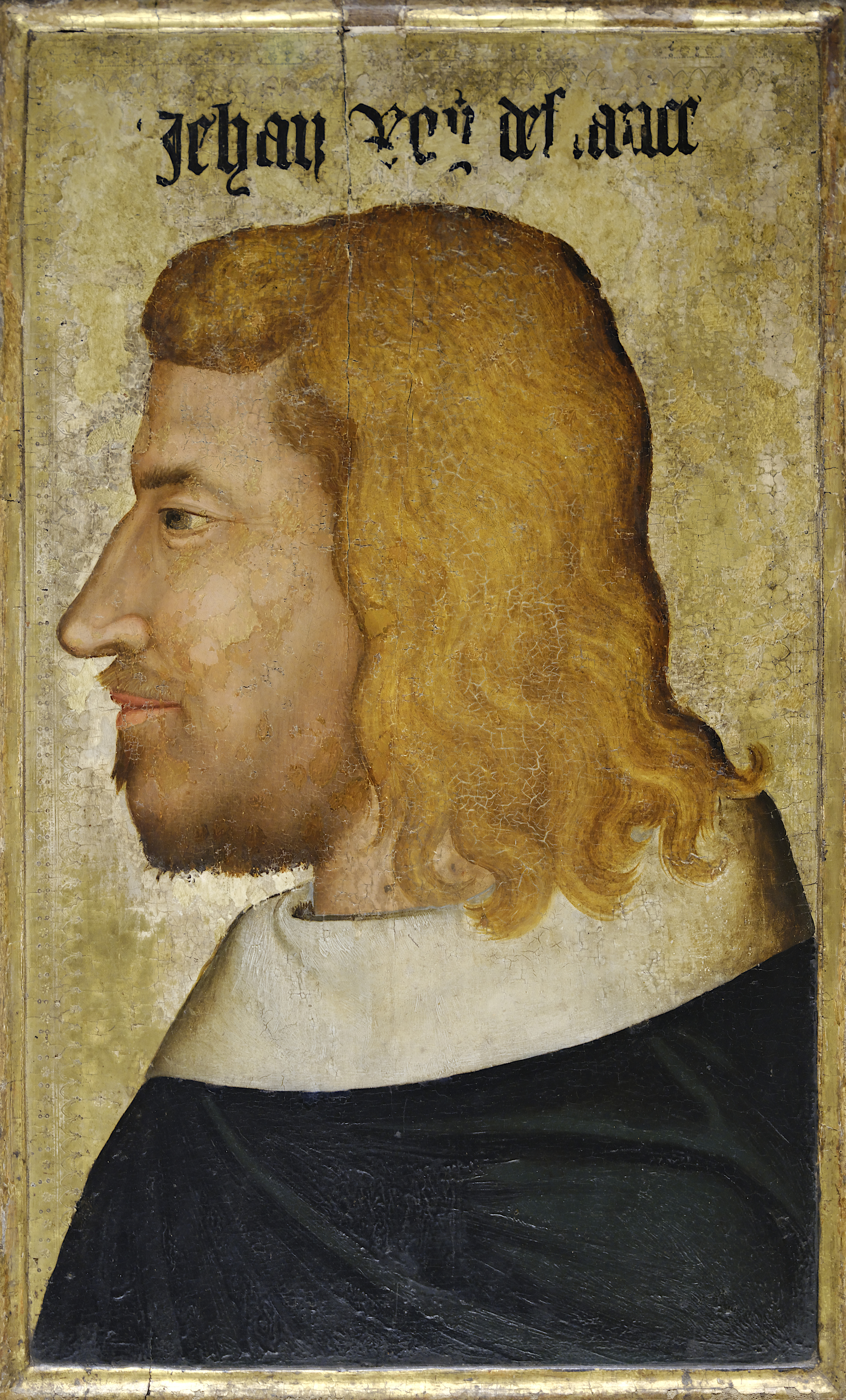
Contemporary image of John II

Negotiations to both end the war and to agree a ransom for the French king began between the royal councils of John and Edward III in October 1357; most of the French Great Council were in London, having been captured by the English. Little was agreed until November, when news arrived that the King of Navarre, known as Charles the Bad, had escaped from his prison cell in France. Charles had a strong claim to the French throne and had repeatedly negotiated with the English, plotted to kidnap John and in 1354 had murdered the constable of France, one of John's closest advisors, in his bedroom, and boasted of it. In April 1356 he had been dining with colleagues at the table of John's eldest son (the Dauphin), Charles, when John arrived accompanied by armed men and arrested ten of the most outspoken diners; four were summarily executed, the others, including Charles the Bad, were imprisoned.

John, correctly believing that Charles would raise an army against the Crown, felt compelled to return to his throne to regain control, while Edward saw this as the best moment to secure a favourable deal. In John's absence France was proving ungovernable. Charles the Dauphin was the regent, but had so little control that in February 1358 two of his senior advisors were murdered in his presence in Paris. Also in February, the French national assembly, the Estates General, fearing what John might agree to, attempted to prohibit him from negotiating with Edward.

To add to the pressure on the French, in October 1357 the Treaty of Berwick was sealed between England and Scotland. This ended the Anglo-Scottish war, fudged the issue of English suzerainty and freed the captured Scottish king, David II, for a ransom of £67,000, to be paid in instalments over ten years. English men and resources previously needed to hold the Scots in check could now be used in France.

By early 1358 the English and French negotiators had agreed that John's personal ransom would be the huge amount of 4 million écus. This was £667,000, which was the equivalent of the peacetime income of the English crown for about 20 years. John was not to be released until an initial payment of 600,000 écus (£100,000) was paid, according to the treaty this was to be received on 1 November. The balance was to be paid in annual instalments for an unspecified period. With regards to a territorial settlement, the final terms were less harsh for France than those incorporated in the never-ratified Treaty of Guînes. (Note: The main difference was that the new treaty excluded the provinces of the western Loire which had been ceded to England by the Treaty of Guînes.) Nevertheless, a quarter of France was to be transferred to England to become its sovereign territory. Nearly all of this was in the south west – Aquitaine, Saintonge, Poitou, Angoumois, Périgord, Agenais, Limousin, Rouergue, Quercy, Bigorre, Gaure – but also included Ponthieu, Montreuil, the Pale of Calais, and parts of Normandy.

There were various other provisions, mostly concerning France's internal affairs, such as France abandoning its long-standing alliance with Scotland and a mechanism for ending the Breton Civil War. Several issues were only agreed in draft in order to speed the process of generating the main agreement – details were to be settled later. Almost all of the senior nobility of France were to be held in England as hostages for compliance with the terms of the treaty, along with two of the more important burghers from each of 20 principal French towns. In exchange the war would be ended and Edward would give up his and his descendants' claim on the French throne. Edward insisted the agreement be so structured that if any of its terms were not fulfilled, the entire treaty lapsed.

It was made public that an agreement had been reached, but the terms were not disclosed. John undertook a campaign to prepare his subjects for the details of the treaty, which he was aware would be unpopular. Edward assisted by releasing four senior French prisoners on parole so they could travel to Paris and commend the agreement to the Dauphin and the main parties making up the Estates General. The draft treaty was received sympathetically by them and ratified by the Dauphin. The treaty was formally sealed by John and Edward on 8 May 1358 at Windsor Castle. John and Edward kissed each other and exchanged rings to demonstrate their new-found amity.

French opinion was strongly against the treaty from the start, and between its sealing and the date on which the first tranche of John's ransom was due the calamitous situation in France grew worse. An unaffiliated army of unemployed soldiers and freebooters, known as routiers, cut a swath of destruction through the Seine valley; Charles of Navarre, backed by armed force, continued to manoeuvre to seize the French throne; a savage peasant uprising, the Jacquerie, broke out against the established order; the Dauphin was forced to leave Paris, he returned in July and laid siege to the city. Raising the money to secure John's freedom was impossible. Brooking no excuses, on 20 November 1358 Edward declared that the treaty with France had lapsed and that fighting would recommence once the truce expired in April.

== Treaty ==
Before the end of 1358 Edward's council had sent out instructions to muster a large army and a commensurate fleet for the following year. By the start of 1359 the English were gathering materiel in preparation for another round of campaigning and it had been agreed to invade northern France. In despair, in February John commenced face to face negotiations with Edward; they rapidly came to a revised agreement, the Second Treaty of London. The ransom amount was reduced to 3 million écus (£500,000) from the 4 million écus in the previous treaty. It was also agreed that this ransom would purchase the release of the many senior French nobles held directly by Edward; it is difficult to quantify this concession, but it has been estimated as being worth more than £50,000 to the French, possibly substantially more. The initial payment was again to be 600,000 écus, payable by 1 August. On receipt of this sum, together with ten leading French nobles and twenty specified fortified places as sureties for the balance, John and his fellow prisoners would be freed. Again many of the practical aspects of ending hostilities were only identified and provisions inserted that the details would be worked out later. These included the evacuation of English-occupied castles which were on territory scheduled to remain French and unwinding the longstanding Anglo-Flemish alliance in an orderly manner.

The significant change from the previous treaty was the increase in the amount of French territory to be ceded to England. In addition to the provinces specified in the First Treaty of London, Brittany, Normandy, Anjou, Touraine and Maine would all become sovereign English land. This meant that almost half of France would be transferred in full sovereignty to England. Edward again agreed to abandon his claims to the French throne, and to make war against Navarre if Charles the Bad did not come to terms with John by 24 June. This treaty was sealed on 24 March in London. There was an outcry against it in France when the details became known and the Dauphin refused to ratify it. In retaliation Edward reinstated the plans to mobilise the English army and invade France.

== Aftermath ==
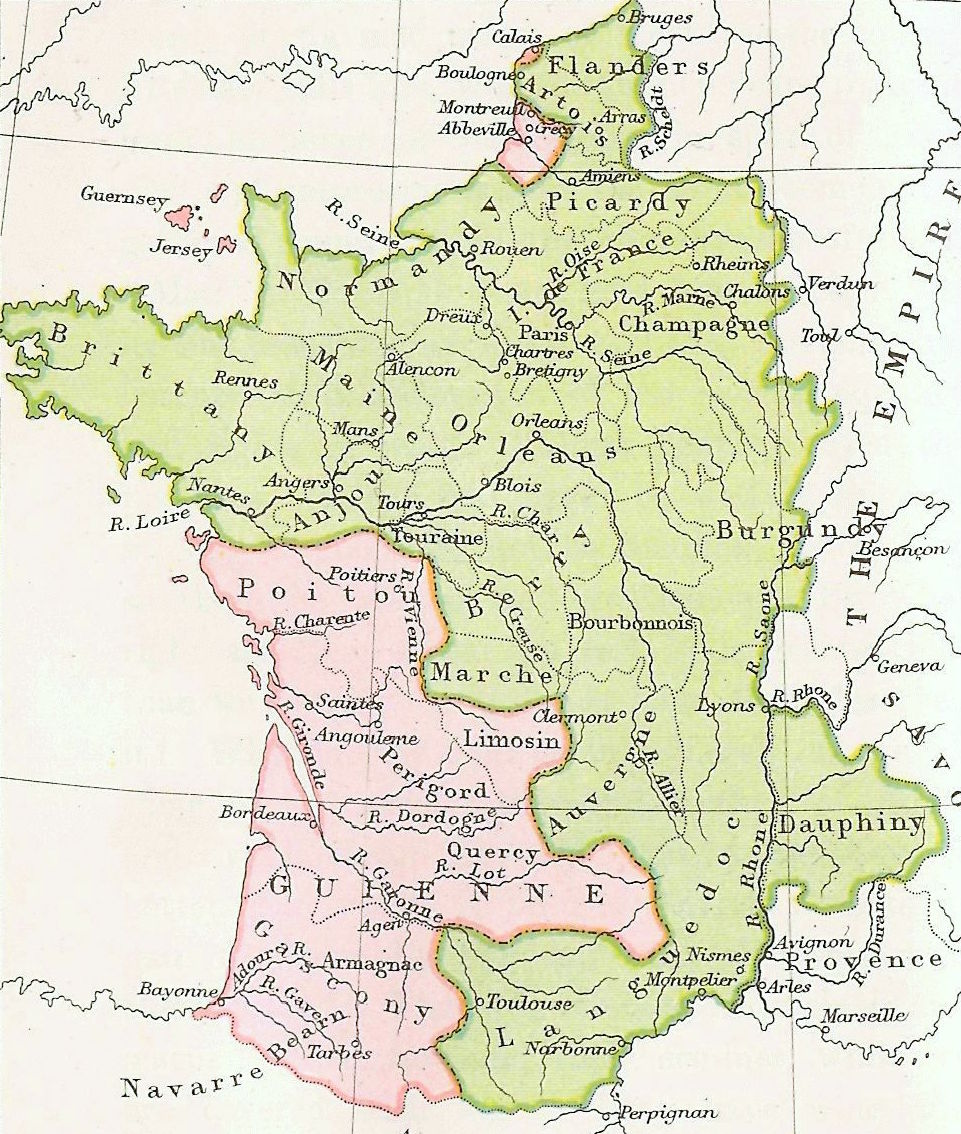
France after the 1360 Treaty of Brétigny; French territory in green, English territory in pink

In October 1359 Edward III led another campaign in northern France. It was unopposed by French forces but was unable to take any strongly fortified places. Instead the English army spread out and for six months devastated much of the region. Both countries were finding it almost impossible to finance continued hostilities, but neither was inclined to change their attitude to the proposed peace terms. On 13 April 1360, near Chartres, a sharp fall in temperature and a heavy hail storm killed many English baggage horses and some soldiers. Taking this as a sign from God, Edward reopened negotiations, directly with the Dauphin. By 8 May the Treaty of Brétigny had been agreed, which largely replicated the First Treaty of London or the Treaty of Guînes.

By this treaty vast areas of France were ceded to England, to be personally ruled by the Black Prince as the Prince of Aquitaine and Gascony and John was ransomed for three million écu. As well as John, sixteen of the more senior nobles captured at Poitiers were finally released with the sealing of this treaty. At the time it seemed this was the end of the war, but large-scale fighting broke out again in 1369 and the Hundred Years' War did not end until 1453, with a French victory which left only Calais in English hands.

== Notes, citations and sources ==
=== Sources ===
- Burne, Alfred (1999) [1955]. The Crecy War. Ware, Hertfordshire: Wordsworth Editions. ISBN 978-1-84022-210-4.
- Curry, Anne (2002). The Hundred Years' War 1337–1453. Oxford: Osprey Publishing. ISBN 978-1-84176-269-2.
- Deaux, George (1969). The Black Death, 1347. London: Hamilton. OCLC 242352826.
- Given-Wilson, Chris & Bériac, Françoise (2001). "Edward III's Prisoners of War: The Battle of Poitiers and its Context". The English Historical Review. 112 (468): 802–833. doi:10.1093/ehr/CXVI.468.802. ISSN 0013-8266. JSTOR 579193.
- Green, David (2011). The Black Prince. New York: History Press. ISBN 978-0-7524-7306-2.
- Harari, Yuval N. (2007). Special Operations in the Age of Chivalry, 1100–1550. Woodbridge, Suffolk: Boydell Press. ISBN 978-1-84383-292-8.
- Hoskins, Peter (2011). In the Steps of the Black Prince: The Road to Poitiers, 1355–1356. Woodbridge, Suffolk: Boydell. ISBN 978-1-84383-611-7.
- Livingstone, Marilyn & Witzel, Morgen (2018). The Black Prince and the Capture of a King, Poitiers 1356. Oxford; Havertown, Pennsylvania: Casemate. ISBN 978-1-61200-452-5.
- Madden, Mollie Marie (2014). The Black Prince at War: The Anatomy of a Chevauchée (PDF) (PhD thesis). Minnesota: University of Minnesota. OCLC 1194717646.
- Mortimer, Ian (2007). The Perfect King: The Life of Edward III, Father of the English Nation. London: Pimlico. ISBN 978-1-84413-530-1.
- Ormrod, W. M. (1990). The Reign of Edward III: Crown and Political Society in England 1327–1377. New Haven; London: Yale. ISBN 978-0-300-04875-9.
- Patourel, John Le (1960). "The Treaty of Brétigny, 1360". Transactions of the Royal Historical Society. 10: 19–39. doi:10.2307/3678772. JSTOR 3678772.
- Penman, Michael (2004). David II. East Linton, East Lothian: Tuckwell Press. ISBN 978-1-8623-2202-8.
- Prestwich, M. (1980). The Three Edwards: War and State in England, 1272–1377. Fakenham: Weidenfeld & Nicolson. ISBN 978-0-29777-730-4.
- Rodger, N. A. M. (2004). The Safeguard of the Sea. London: Penguin. ISBN 978-0-14-029724-9.
- Rogers, Clifford J. (1994). "Edward III and the Dialectics of Strategy, 1327–1360". Transactions of the Royal Historical Society. 4: 83–102. doi:10.2307/3679216. JSTOR 3679216. OCLC 931311378. S2CID 163041276.
- Rogers, Clifford J. (2001). "The Anglo-French Peace Negotiations of 1354–1360 Reconsidered". In Bothwell, J. S. (ed.). The Age of Edward III. Woodbridge, Suffolk: York Medieval Press. pp. 193–214. ISBN 978-1-903153-06-2.
- Rogers, Clifford J. (2014) [2000]. War Cruel and Sharp: English Strategy under Edward III, 1327–1360. Woodbridge, Suffolk: Boydell Press. ISBN 978-0-85115-804-4.
- Sumption, Jonathan (1990). Trial by Battle. The Hundred Years' War. Vol. I. London: Faber and Faber. ISBN 978-0-571-20095-5.
- Sumption, Jonathan (1999). Trial by Fire. The Hundred Years' War. Vol. II. London: Faber and Faber. ISBN 978-0-571-13896-8.
- Wagner, John A. (2006). Encyclopedia of the Hundred Years War. Woodbridge, Suffolk: Greenwood. ISBN 978-0-313-32736-0.
