= Brétigny =

Brétigny or Bretigny may refer to the following places:

- in France:
  - Bretigny, Côte-d'Or, in the Côte-d'Or département
  - Brétigny, Eure, in the Eure département
  - Brétigny, Oise, in the Oise département
  - Brétigny, Eure-et-Loir, a village in the Eure-et-Loir département in which the Treaty of Brétigny was signed
  - Brétigny-sur-Orge, in the Essonne département
    - Brétigny-sur-Orge Air Base
- Bretigny-sur-Morrens, in the Canton of Vaud, Switzerland
- CEV Brétigny - Centre d'essais en vol de Brétigny-sur-Orge a former French military research establishment designated BA217 (Base Aerienne 217).
