= Battle of Poitiers =

1356 battle of the Hundred Years' War

- Part of the Black Prince's chevauchée of 1356 of the Edwardian phase of the Hundred Years' War
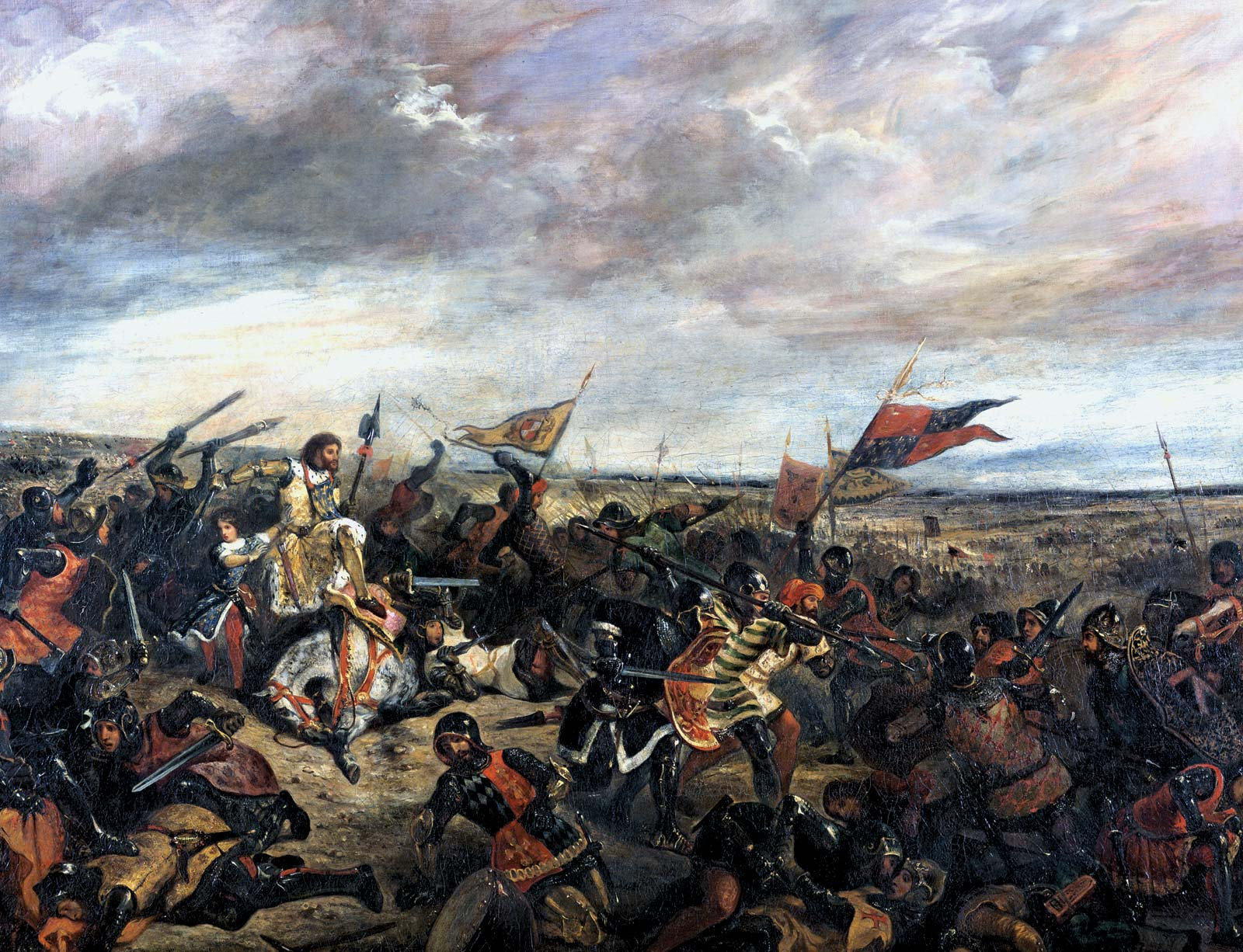
- The Battle of Poitiers (1830)
Date	19 September 1356
Location	Near Poitiers, France 46°31′20″N 0°24′12″E
Result	English victory

Belligerents
England	France

Commanders and leaders
Edward, the Black Prince	John II (POW)

Strength
6,000	14,000–16,000

Casualties and losses
~40 men-at-arms killed An unknown but much larger number of common infantry killed	More than 4,500 men-at-arms killed or captured Either 1,500 or 3,800 common infantry killed or captured

The Battle of Poitiers was fought on 19 September 1356, during the Hundred Years' War, between a French army commanded by King John II and an Anglo-Gascon force under Edward, the Black Prince. It took place in western France, 5 miles (8 km) south of Poitiers, when approximately 14,000 to 16,000 French attacked a strong defensive position held by 6,000 Anglo-Gascons.

Nineteen years after the start of the war, Edward, the Black Prince, the eldest son and heir of King Edward III of England, launched a major campaign in south-west France. His army marched from Bergerac to the River Loire, which they were unable to cross. King John II gathered a large and unusually mobile army and pursued Edward's forces. The Anglo-Gascons had by this point established a strong defensive position near Poitiers, and after unsuccessful negotiations between the two sides, were attacked by the French.

The first assault included two units of heavily armoured cavalry, a strong force of crossbowmen as well as many infantry and dismounted men-at-arms. They were driven back by the Anglo-Gascons, who were fighting entirely on foot. A second French attack by 4,000 men-at-arms on foot under King John II's son and heir Charles, the dauphin, followed. After a prolonged fight, this too was repulsed. As the Dauphin's division recoiled there was confusion in the French ranks: about half the men of their third division, under Philip, Duke of Orléans, left the field, taking with them all four of John's sons. Some of those who did not withdraw with Philip launched a weak and unsuccessful third assault. The remaining French forces regrouped around the king and launched a fourth attack against the now exhausted Anglo-Gascons, who were still fighting on foot. The French sacred banner, the Oriflamme, borne by Geoffroi de Charny was unfurled, the signal that no prisoners were to be taken. Battle was again joined, with the French slowly getting the better of it. Then a small, mounted, Anglo-Gascon force of 160 men, who had been sent earlier to threaten the French rear, appeared behind the French. Believing themselves surrounded, some Frenchmen fled, which panicked others, and soon the entire French force collapsed.

King John II was captured, as were his 14-year-old son Philip and between 2,000 and 3,000 men-at-arms. Approximately 2,500 French men-at-arms were killed. Additionally, either 1,500 or 3,800 French common infantry were killed or captured. The surviving French dispersed, while the Anglo-Gascons continued their withdrawal to Gascony. The following spring a two-year truce was agreed and the Black Prince escorted John to London. Populist revolts broke out across France. Negotiations to end the war and ransom John were prolonged. In response Edward launched a further campaign in 1359. During this, both sides compromised and the Treaty of Brétigny was agreed in 1360 by which vast areas of France were ceded to England, to be ruled by the Black Prince, and John was ransomed for three million gold écu. Although this appeared to end the war, the French resumed hostilities in 1369 and recaptured most of the lost territory. The war eventually ended in a French victory in 1453.

== Background ==
Since the Norman Conquest of 1066, English monarchs had held titles and lands within France, the possession of which made them vassals of the kings of France. By the first quarter of the fourteenth century, the only significant French possession still held by the English in France was Gascony in the south-west. But Gascony was disproportionately important: duty levied by the English Crown on wine from Bordeaux, the capital of Gascony, totalled more than all other English customs duties combined and was by far the largest source of state income. Bordeaux had a population of more than 50,000, greater than London's, and Bordeaux was possibly richer. Following a series of disagreements between Philip VI of France (r. 1328–1350) and Edward III of England (r. 1327–1377), on 24 May 1337 Philip's Great Council agreed that the lands held by Edward III in France should be taken back into Philip's hands on the grounds that Edward III was in breach of his obligations as a vassal. This marked the start of the Hundred Years' War, which was to last 116 years.

France in 1330: only Gascony and some smaller territories remained under English control.

Although Gascony was the cause of the war, Edward III was able to spare few resources for its defence. In most campaigning seasons the Gascons had to rely on their own resources and had been hard-pressed by the French. Typically the Gascons could field 3,000 to 6,000 men, the large majority infantry, although up to two-thirds of them would be tied down in garrisoning their fortifications. In 1345 and 1346 Henry, Earl of Lancaster, led a series of successful Anglo-Gascon campaigns in Aquitaine and was able to push the focus of the fighting away from the heart of Gascony.

The French port of Calais fell to the English in August 1347 after the Crécy campaign. Shortly after this the Truce of Calais was signed, partially the result of both countries being financially exhausted. The same year the Black Death reached northern France and southern England and is estimated to have killed a third of the population of Western Europe; the death rate was over 40% in southern England. This catastrophe, which lasted until 1350, temporarily halted the fighting. The treaty was extended repeatedly over the years; this did not stop ongoing naval clashes, nor small-scale fighting – which was especially fierce in south-west France – nor occasional fighting on a larger scale.

A treaty to end the war was negotiated at Guînes and signed on 6 April 1354. However, the composition of the inner council of the French king, John II (r. 1350–1364), changed and sentiment turned against its terms. John decided not to ratify it, and it was clear that from the summer of 1355 both sides would be committed to full-scale war. In April 1355 Edward III and his council, with the treasury in an unusually favourable financial position, decided to launch offensives that year in both northern France and Gascony. John attempted to strongly garrison his northern towns and fortifications against the expected descent by Edward III, at the same time as assembling a field army; he was unable to, largely because of a lack of money.

=== Black Prince arrives ===
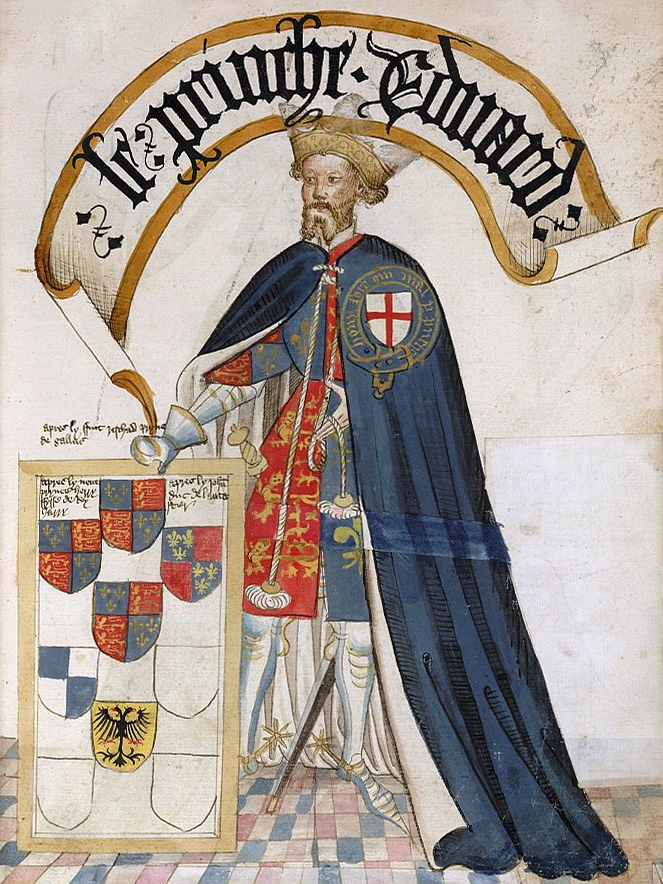
Edward, the Black Prince

In 1355 Edward III's eldest son, Edward of Woodstock, later known as the Black Prince, was given the Gascon command and began assembling men, shipping and supplies. He arrived in Bordeaux on 20 September accompanied by 2,200 English soldiers. The next day he was formally acknowledged as the king's lieutenant in Gascony, with plenipotentiary powers, by the Gascon officials and dignitaries. Gascon nobles reinforced him to a strength of somewhere between 5,000 and 6,000 and provided a bridging train and a substantial supply train.

Edward set out on 5 October on a chevauchée, which was a large-scale mounted raid. The Anglo-Gascon force marched from Bordeaux 300 miles (480 km) to Narbonne – almost on the Mediterranean coast and deep in French-held territory – and back to Gascony. They devastated a wide swathe of French territory and sacked many French towns on the way. John, Count of Armagnac, who commanded the local French forces, avoided battle, and there was little fighting. While no territory was captured, enormous economic damage was done to France; the modern historian Clifford Rogers concluded "the importance of the economic attrition aspect of the chevauchée can hardly be exaggerated." The expedition returned to Gascony on 2 December having marched 675 miles (1,100 km).

=== 1356 ===
The English troops resumed the offensive from Gascony after Christmas to great effect. More than 50 French-held towns or fortifications were captured during the following four months, including strategically important towns close to the borders of Gascony, and others more than 80 miles (130 km) away. Local French commanders did not attempt countermeasures. Several members of the local French nobility changed allegiance to the English; the Black Prince received homage from them on 24 April 1356.

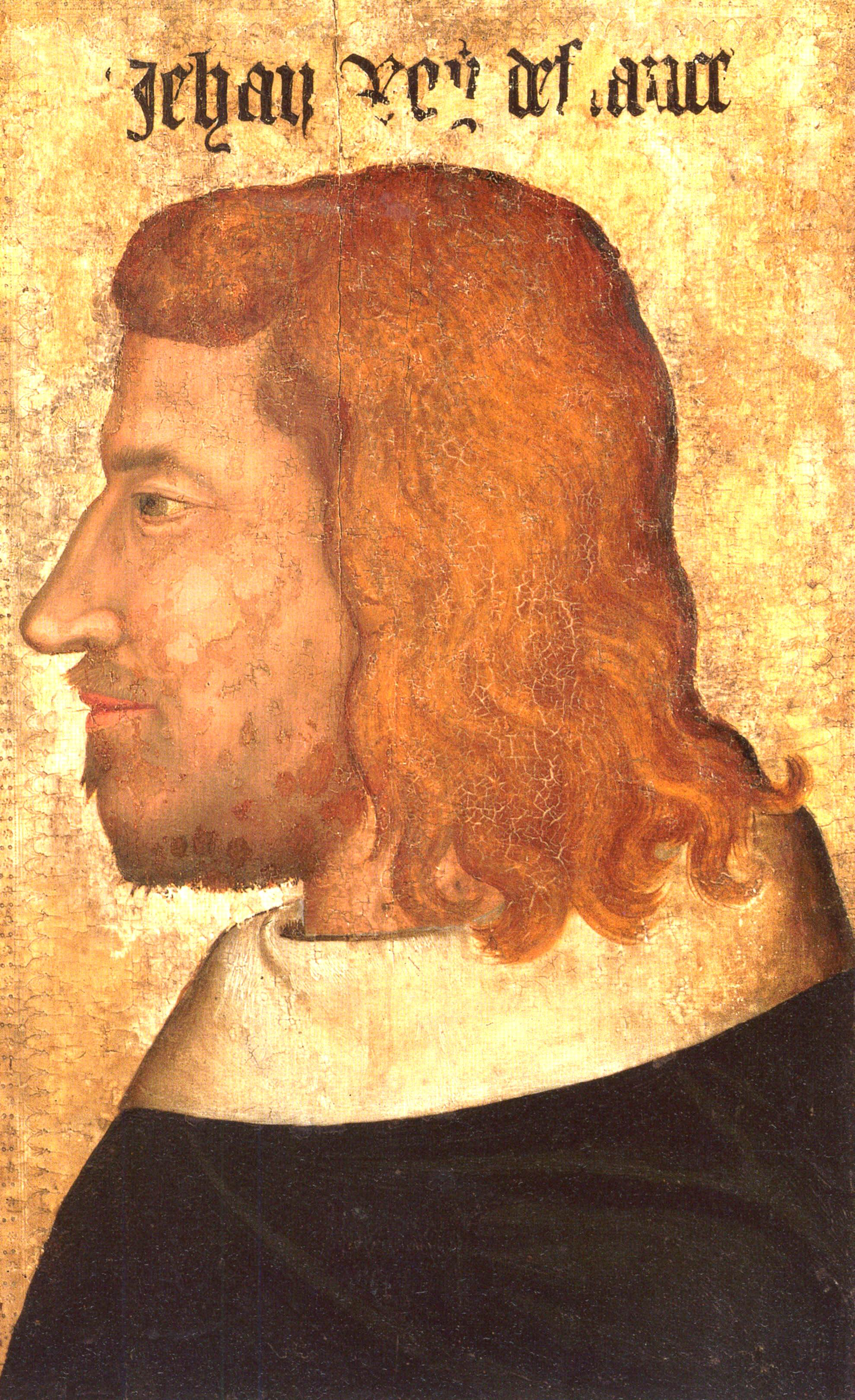
Contemporary image of John II

Money and enthusiasm for the war were running low in France. The modern historian Jonathan Sumption describes the French national administration as "fall[ing] apart in jealous acrimony and recrimination". A contemporary chronicler recorded "the King of France was severely hated in his own realm". The town of Arras rebelled and killed loyalists. The major nobles of Normandy refused to pay taxes. On 5 April 1356 John arrested the notoriously treacherous Charles II, king of Navarre, one of the largest landholders in Normandy (Note: Known as "Charles the Bad", he had repeatedly plotted with the English and in 1354 had murdered the constable of France, one of John's closest advisers, in his bedroom and boasted of it.) and nine more of his more outspoken critics; four were summarily executed. The Norman nobles who had not been arrested turned to Edward for assistance.

Seeing an opportunity, Edward III diverted an expedition planned for Brittany under Henry of Lancaster to Normandy in late June. Lancaster set off with 2,300 men and pillaged and burnt his way eastward across Normandy. King John moved to Rouen with a much stronger force, hoping to intercept Lancaster. After relieving and re-victualling the besieged fortifications of Breteuil and Pont-Audemer the English stormed and sacked the town of Verneuil. John pursued, but bungled several opportunities to bring the English to battle and they escaped. In three weeks the expedition had, with few casualties, seized a large amount of loot including many horses, cemented new alliances, and damaged the French economy and prestige. The French King returned to Breteuil and re-established the siege, where he continued to be distracted from the English preparations for a greater chevauchée from south-west France.

== Prelude ==
=== Manoeuvres ===
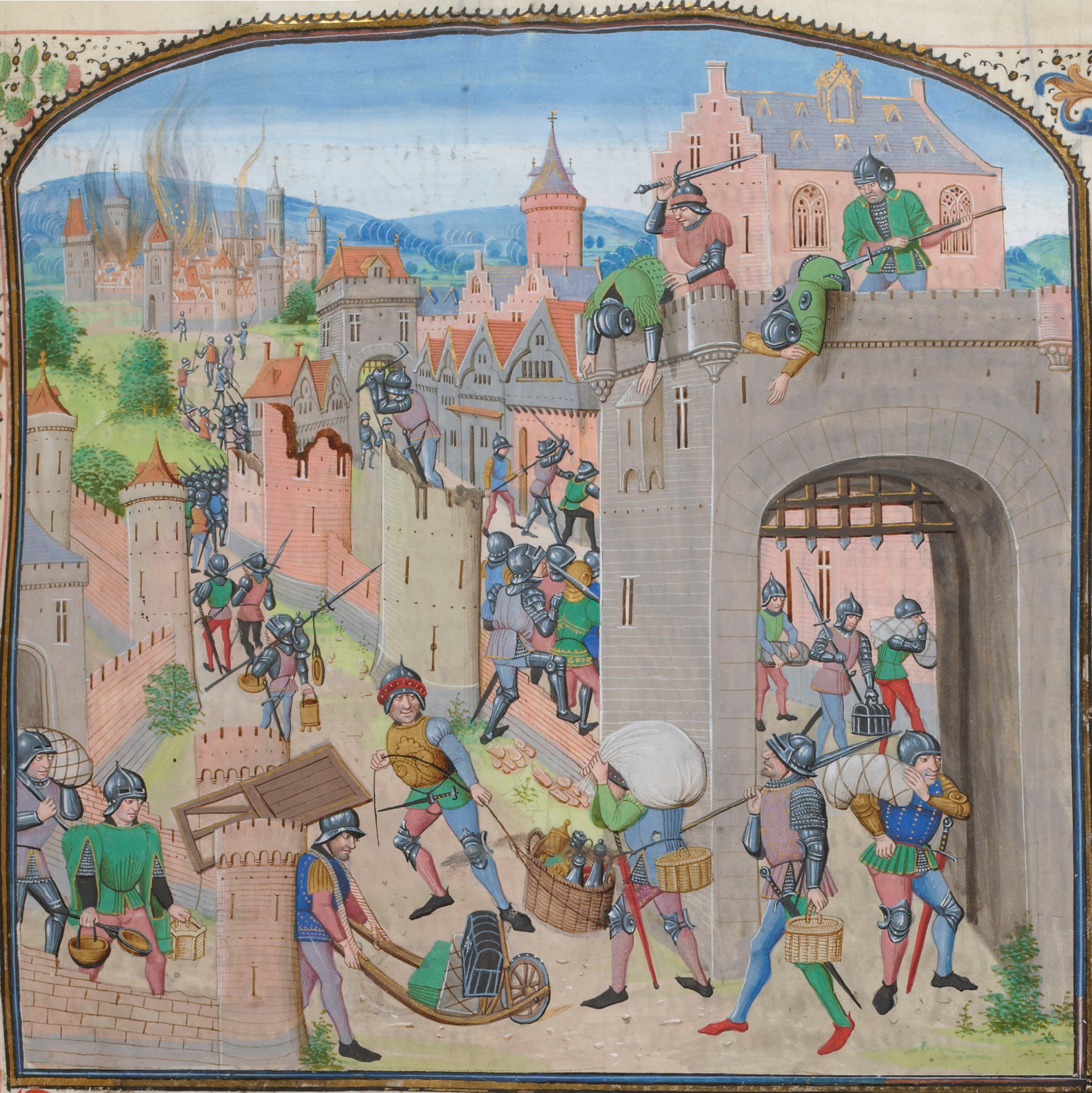
A town being sacked

On 4 August 1356 a combined force of 6,000 Gascon and English fighting men headed north from Bergerac. They were accompanied by approximately 4,000 non-combatants. All of the fighting men were mounted, including those who would always fight on foot, such as the archers. On 14 August the Anglo-Gascon army separated into three divisions, which moved north abreast of each other and began to systematically devastate the countryside. There would be approximately 40 miles (64 km) between the flanking units, enabling them to devastate a band of French territory more than 50 miles (80 km) wide, yet be able to unite to face an enemy at approximately a day's notice. They advanced slowly, to facilitate their tasks of looting and destruction. The modern historian David Green describes the progress of the Black Prince's army as "deliberately destructive, extremely brutal ... methodical and sophisticated." Several strong castles were assaulted and captured. The populaces of most towns fled, or surrendered at the first sight of Anglo-Gascon troops. Overall, there was little French resistance. If a French field army had been in the area, the Anglo-Gascon forces would have had to stay relatively close together, ready to support each other if attacked. The absence of any such French force enabled the Prince's formations to disperse widely to maximise their destructive effect on the French countryside.

Map showing the routes of the Anglo-Gascon and French armies

The main French army remained in Normandy. Despite it being clear that Breteuil could be neither stormed nor starved, John felt unable to abandon its siege as this would undermine his prestige as a warrior-king. He declined to march against the Black Prince, declaring that the garrison of Breteuil posed a more serious threat. At some point in August an unusually large belfry, or mobile siege tower, was pushed up to the walls of Breteuil and a full-scale assault launched. The defenders set fire to the belfry and repulsed the attack. Sumption describes the French losses in this attack as "terrible" and the entire second siege as "a pointless endeavour". The historian Kenneth Fowler describes the siege as "magnificent but archaic". Eventually John had to give way to the pressure to do something to prevent the destruction being inflicted in south-west France. Sometime around 20 August he offered the garrison of Breteuil free passage, a huge bribe and permission to take with them their valuables and goods, which persuaded them to vacate the town. The French army promptly marched south, as all available forces were concentrated against the Black Prince.

Hearing on 28 August that John was marching on Tours and was prepared to give battle, the Black Prince moved his three divisions closer together and ordered them to move towards Tours. He was also willing to fight an open battle, if he could do so under the right circumstances. He still hoped to cross the Loire River, both to be able to come to grips with the French army and to link up with either Edward III's or Lancaster's army, if they were in the area. The French royal army from Breteuil had moved to Chartres, where it received reinforcements, particularly of men-at-arms. John sent home nearly all of the infantry contingents, which reduced the French wage bill and left an entirely mounted force that had the mobility and speed to match that of the Black Prince's all-mounted army. Two hundred Scottish picked men-at-arms under William, Lord of Douglas, joined John at Chartres. Once John felt he had an overwhelmingly strong force it set off south towards the Loire, and then south-west along its north bank. Early on 8 September the Black Prince's army reached Tours, where he received news that Lancaster was not far to the east, on the other side of the Loire, and hoped to join him soon. The Anglo-Gascons prepared for battle and expected the imminent arrival of the French. But John had crossed the Loire at Blois, to the east of Tours, on 10 September, where he was joined by the army of his son John, Count of Poitiers.

Meanwhile, the anticipated support from England failed to materialise. In early August an Aragonese galley fleet, which had sailed from Barcelona in April, arrived in the English Channel. The fleet hired by the French only contained nine galleys, but it caused panic among the English. Edward's attempts to raise an army to send to France were still underway and shipping was being assembled. The troops gathered were split up to guard the coast and the ships sailing to Southampton to transport the army were ordered to remain in port until the galleys had left. At some point in August Lancaster marched south from eastern Brittany with an army of 2,500 men or more. The unusual height of the Loire and the French control of its bridges meant Lancaster was unable to cross and effect a junction. In early September he abandoned the attempt to force a crossing at Les Ponts-de-Cé and returned to Brittany where he laid siege to its capital, Rennes.

=== Strategy ===
The Anglo-Gascon army was treading a balance. While there were no large French forces facing them they spread out to loot and despoil the land. But their primary objective was to use the threat of devastation to force, or perhaps persuade, the French army to attack them. The Anglo-Gascons were confident that fighting defensively on ground of their choosing they could defeat a numerically superior French force. In the event of the French being too numerous they were equally confident that they could avoid battle by manoeuvring. The French, aware of this approach, usually attempted to isolate English forces against a river or the sea, where the threat of starvation would force them to take the tactical offensive and attack the French in a prepared position. Once he crossed the Loire, John repeatedly attempted to interpose his army between the Anglo-Gascons and Gascony, so they would be forced to try and fight their way out. Meanwhile, the Black Prince did not wish to rapidly retreat to the safety of Gascony, but to manoeuvre in the vicinity of the French army so as to persuade it to attack on unfavourable terms, without himself becoming cut off. He was aware that John had been eager to fight Lancaster's force in Normandy in June and anticipated this enthusiasm for battle would continue.

=== Movement to contact ===
Once he had crossed the Loire on 10 September and been reinforced John moved to cut off the Anglo-Gascon line of retreat. Hearing of this, and losing hope that Lancaster would be able to join him, the Black Prince moved his army some 8 miles (13 km) south to Montbazon where he took up a fresh defensive position on 12 September. The same day John's son and heir, Charles, the Dauphin, entered Tours, having travelled from Normandy with 1,000 men-at-arms, and Hélie de Talleyrand-Périgord, Cardinal of Périgord, arrived at the Black Prince's camp to attempt to negotiate a two-day truce on behalf of Pope Innocent VI. According to differing sources this was to be followed by peace negotiations or an arranged battle. The Black Prince dismissed Talleyrand and, happy to do battle, but concerned that a two-day delay would leave his army with its back to the Loire in an area with few supplies, marched hard and crossed the River Creuse at La Haye on 13 September, 25 miles (40 km) to the south. John, aware he outnumbered the Anglo-Gascons, was also eager to wipe them out in battle and so similarly ignored Talleyrand. The French army continued to march south parallel to the English, rather than moving directly towards them, with the aim of cutting their lines of retreat and supply. On 14 September the English marched 15 miles (24 km) south-west to Châtellerault on the Vienne.

At Châtellerault the Black Prince felt there were no geographical barriers against which the French could pin his army and that he was occupying an advantageous defensive position. He arrived there on 14 September, the day Talleyrand had proposed for the two armies to engage in battle, and waited for the French to come to him. Two days later his scouts reported that John had bypassed his position and was about to cross the Vienne at Chauvigny. At this point the French had lost track of the Anglo-Gascon army and were unaware of its position, but were about to position themselves 20 miles (32 km) south of the Anglo-Gascons and directly in their path back to friendly territory. The Black Prince saw an opportunity to attack the French while they were on the march, or possibly even while crossing the Vienne, and so set off at first light on 17 September to intercept them, leaving his baggage train behind to follow on as best it could.

When the Anglo-Gascon vanguard reached Chauvigny most of the French army had already crossed and marched on towards Poitiers. A force of 700 men-at-arms of the French rearguard was intercepted near Savigny-Lévescault. Contemporary accounts note that they were not wearing helmets, suggesting they were completely unarmoured and not expecting battle. They were rapidly routed with 240 killed or captured, including 3 counts taken prisoner. Many Anglo-Gascons pursued the remaining, fleeing, French, although the Black Prince held back most of his army, not wishing to scatter it in the close vicinity of the enemy, and camped at Savigny-Lévescault. In response, John drew up his army outside Poitiers in battle order.

=== Negotiations ===
On 18 September the Anglo-Gascons marched towards Poitiers arrayed for battle. They took up a strong, carefully selected position 5 miles (8 km) south of Poitiers on a wooded hill in the Fôret de Nouaillé and began preparing it for a defensive battle: digging pits to impede the French advance (especially that of mounted troops) and trenches, and forming barricades to fight behind. They hoped that the French would launch an impromptu assault. Instead, Talleyrand rode up to negotiate. The Black Prince was initially disinclined to delay any battle. He was persuaded to discuss terms after Talleyrand pointed out that the two armies were now so close that if the French declined to attack, the Anglo-Gascons would find it almost impossible to withdraw. If they attempted to, the French would attack, aiming to defeat them in detail, and if they stood their position they would run out of supplies before the French. The Anglo-Gascons had to stay concentrated in the presence of the French army, and several days' hard marching had reduced the opportunities to forage. Because of this, food was almost exhausted. Unknown to Talleyrand the Anglo-Gascons were already unable to find sufficient water for their horses.

After lengthy negotiations the Black Prince agreed extensive concessions in exchange for free passage to Gascony. (Note: The Black Prince agreed to return all prisoners and territory taken over the past three years, refrain from fighting the French for seven years and pay 100,000 écu.) However, they were dependent on the agreement being ratified by his father, Edward III. Unknown to Talleyrand or the French, Edward had given his son written permission to, in such circumstances, "help himself by making a truce or armistice, or in any other way that seems best to him." This has caused modern historians to doubt the Prince's sincerity. The French discussed these proposals at length, with John in favour. Several senior advisers felt it would be humiliating to, as they saw it, have at their mercy the Anglo-Gascon army which had devastated so much of France and to tamely allow it to escape. John was persuaded and Talleyrand informed the Black Prince he could expect a battle. Attempts to agree a site for the battle failed, as the French wished the Anglo-Gascons to move out of their strong defensive position and the English wished to remain there. At dawn on 19 September Talleyrand again attempted to arrange a truce, but as his army's supplies were already running out the Black Prince rejected this.

== Opposing forces ==
=== Anglo-Gascon army ===
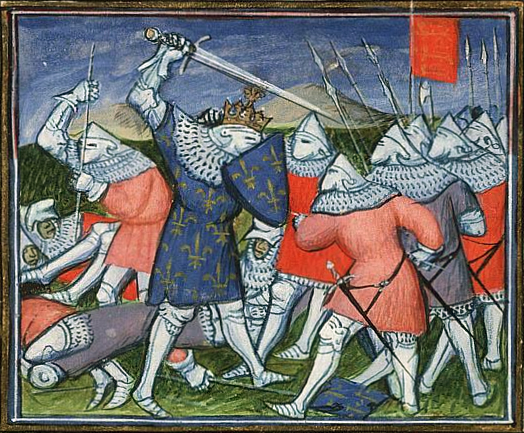
The Battle of Poitiers, from a 15th-century illuminated manuscript of Jean Froissart's Chronicles

The Anglo-Gascon army is generally considered by modern historians to have consisted of 6,000 men: 3,000 men-at-arms, 2,000 English and Welsh longbowmen and 1,000 Gascon infantry. The latter included many equipped with either crossbows or javelins, both classed as light infantry. Some contemporary accounts give lower numbers of 4,800 or 5,000. The division of the men-at-arms between English and Gascons is not recorded, but the previous year, when campaigning with a similarly sized army, 1,000 of the Prince's men-at-arms had been English. All of the Anglo-Gascons travelled on horses, but all or nearly all of them dismounted to fight.

The men-at-arms of both armies were, broadly, knights or knights in training. They were drawn from the landed gentry and ranged from great lords to the relatives and attendants of minor landowners. They needed to be able to equip themselves with a full suit of armour and a warhorse. They wore a quilted gambeson under chain mail which covered the body and limbs. This was supplemented by varying amounts of plate armour on the body and limbs, more so for wealthier and more experienced men. Heads were protected by bascinets: open-faced military iron or steel helmets, with mail attached to the lower edge of the helmet to protect the throat, neck and shoulders. A moveable visor (face guard) protected the face. Heater shields, typically made from thin wood overlaid with leather, were carried. The English men-at-arms were all dismounted. The weapons they used are not recorded, but in similar battles they used their lances as pikes, cut them down to use as short spears, or fought with swords and battle-axes.

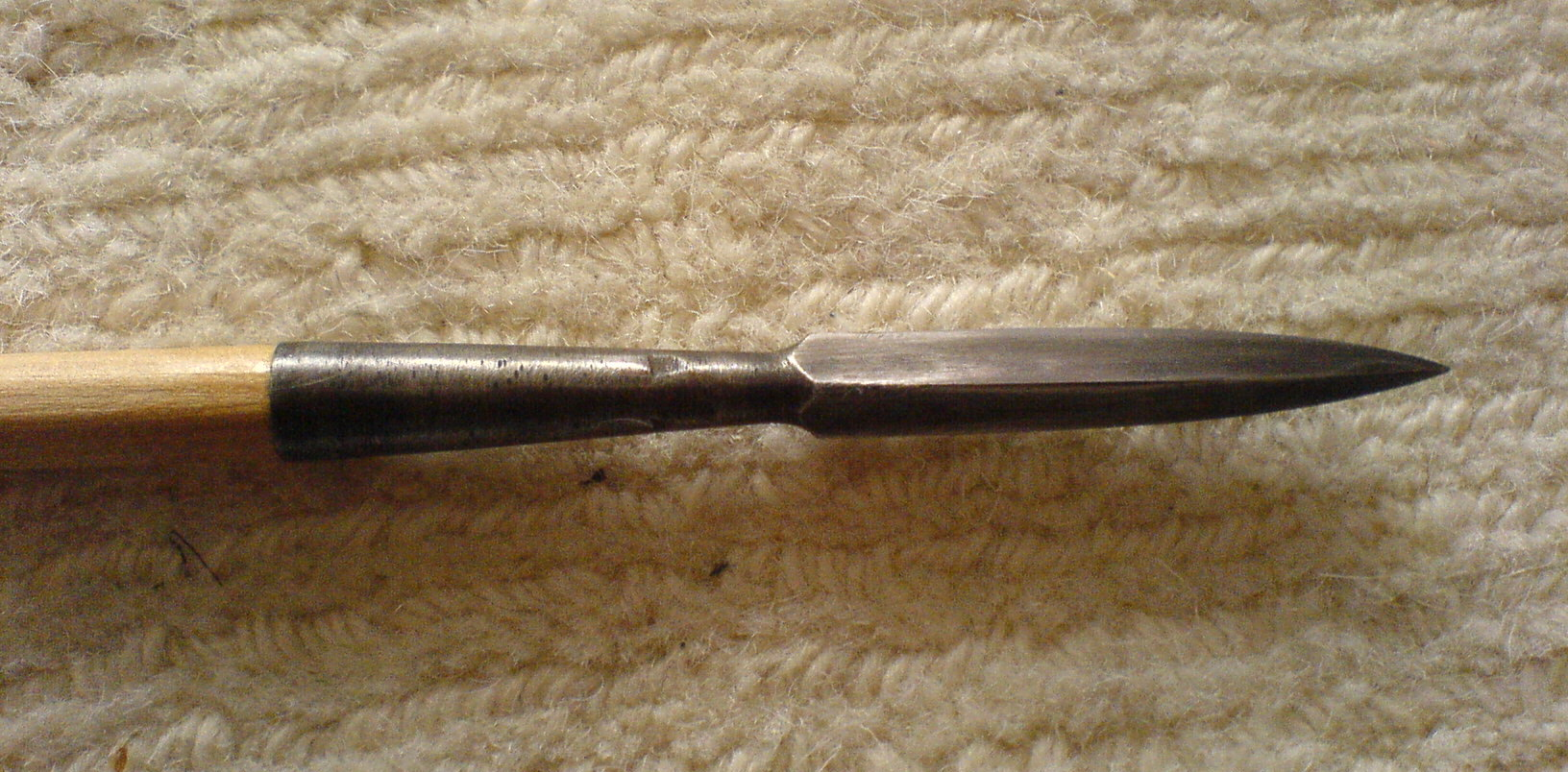
A modern replica of a bodkin point arrowhead used by English longbows to penetrate armour

The longbow used by the English and Welsh archers was unique to them; it took up to ten years to master and an experienced archer could discharge up to ten arrows per minute well over 330 yards (300 m). (Note: This range is given by material scientists and is supported by most modern historians. Some historians argue that the range of a longbow would not have exceeded 210 yards (200 m).) Computer analysis by Warsaw University of Technology in 2017 demonstrated that heavy bodkin point arrows could penetrate typical plate armour of the time at 250 yards (230 m). The depth of penetration would be slight at that range; predicted penetration increased as the range closed or against armour of less than the best quality available at the time. (Note: When computer modelling from 2006 was matched against the performance of replica bows, these were found to be "in good agreement with experimental measurements".) At short range longbow arrows could pierce any practicable thickness of plate armour if they struck at the correct angle. Archers carried one quiver of 24 arrows as standard. There may have been a resupply of ammunition from the wagons to the rear during the battle to at least some longbowmen; the archers also ventured forward during pauses in the fighting to retrieve arrows.

The Anglo-Gascons were divided into three divisions or "battles". The one on the left was commanded by Thomas, Earl of Warwick, marshal of England and a veteran of the Battle of Crecy, where he had been guardian to the Black Prince. He had as deputies John, Earl of Oxford, and the Gascon lord Jean, Captal de Buch; they were assisted by mostly Gascon lords. As well as 1,000 men-at-arms, Warwick's division contained approximately 1,000 archers. The archers were positioned to the left of the men-at-arms. The right flank was under William, Earl of Salisbury, deputised by Robert, Earl of Suffolk, and Maurice, Baron Berkeley. Salisbury's division, like Warwick's, consisted of about 1,000 men-at-arms and 1,000 Welsh and English longbowmen. Again the archers were positioned on the flank of the men-at-arms, in this case the right. The Black Prince took command of the centre division, which consisted of men-at-arms and Gascon infantry: about 1,000 of each, only the flanking divisions contained longbowmen. He had two veteran campaigners, John Chandos and James Audley, as his deputies. Initially the Prince's force was held back behind the other two divisions as a reserve. Each division deployed four to five men deep. It is possible a further, small, reserve was held back behind the Prince's division.

=== French army ===
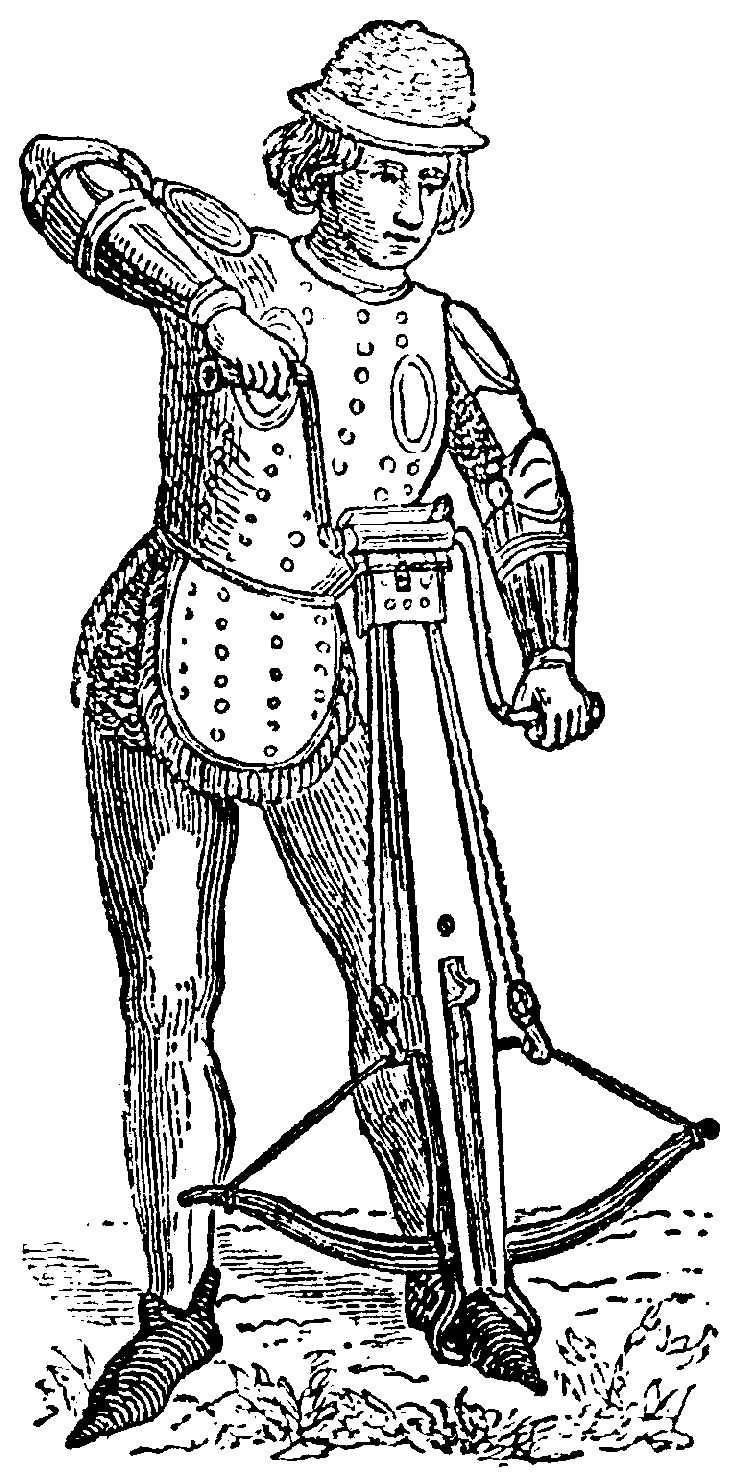
A crossbowman of the period, reloading

The French army was made up of between 14,000 and 16,000 men: 10,000 to 12,000 were men-at-arms, 2,000 were crossbowmen and 2,000 were infantrymen who were not classed as men-at-arms. Although most or all of the French had travelled mounted, they all fought dismounted at Poitiers except for two small groups of mounted knights, totalling either 300 or 500. These were selected from the Frenchmen who had the best armour, especially on their horses; horse armour is known as barding and the use of plate armour for this was a recent innovation in Western Europe. Their riders were equipped as the dismounted men-at-arms, apart from the superior quality of their armour. They wielded wooden lances, usually ash, tipped with iron and approximately 13 feet (4 m) long; their dismounted colleagues retained their lances, but cut them down to 5 to 6 feet (1.5 to 1.8 m) in order to use them as short spears. The crossbowmen wore metal helmets, brigandines (thick leather jerkins with varying amounts of small pieces of plate armour sewn to them) and possibly chain-mail hauberks. Crossbowmen usually fought from behind pavises – very large shields with their own bearers, behind each of which three crossbowmen could shelter. A trained crossbowman could shoot his weapon approximately twice a minute and had a shorter effective range than a longbowman of about 220 yards (200 m).

The French army was divided into four battles. The foremost division was led by the constable of France, Walter, Count of Brienne. As well as a large core of French men-at-arms it included 200 Scottish men-at-arms under William Douglas, most of the French infantry and crossbowmen and all of their cavalry. The two small groups of cavalry were each led by one of the two marshals of France: Arnoul d'Audrehem and Jean de Clermont. The leading French were approximately 500 yards (500 m) from the English. Behind this was a division led jointly by John's 19-year-old son and heir and John's uncle: Charles, the Dauphin, and Peter, Duke of Bourbon, respectively; Charles was experiencing his first taste of war. This formation consisted entirely of dismounted men-at-arms, 4,000 of them. The third division was led by John's younger brother, Philip, Duke of Orléans, also inexperienced in war, and was made up of approximately 3,200 men-at-arms. The rearmost division, of 2,000 men-at-arms and an uncertain number of crossbowmen, was commanded by the king himself.

== Battle ==
=== First attack ===
The English had slept in or near their defensive positions and just after dawn – which would have been at 5:40 am – the French drew themselves up in battle order with their leading men about 500 yards (500 m) from the English positions. After the two armies had been facing each other for about two hours the French detected movement among the English, and believed the Black Prince's personal standard was withdrawing. There is modern debate as to what movement took place. Some scholars have proposed that the movement was of wagons, escorted by cavalry from Warwick's division; the wagons may have been empty and returning to their laager in the rear, or full and moving to a safer position away from the front line, or both and the start of a staged withdrawal by the English. If the latter their escort may have been most or all of Warwick's division and the movement of the standard was possibly his being mistaken for the Prince's or the Prince moving back as the second part of the disengagement. Another proposal is that the Black Prince deliberately had his troops move to simulate a withdrawal and provoke a French attack. The commanders of the leading French division took the movement to be a full-scale English withdrawal and ordered their men to advance, thinking this movement would effectively be a pursuit, thus starting the fighting.

Audrehem's cavalry attacked Warwick's division on the English left, while Clermont charged Salisbury's on the right. In both cases the French plan was that they clear away the English archers, while given fire support by their own crossbowmen. However, the archers in Warwick's division were positioned in the edge of a marsh and this terrain prevented the French cavalry from getting to grips with them. The archers in turn found that the French armour and barding prevented them from firing effectively. To get close enough to penetrate the French armour, the longbowmen would have had to leave the protection of the marsh, which would have exposed them to the risk of being ridden down by the French. Instead, they turned their fire on the supporting crossbowmen and, having a superior rate of fire, were able to suppress them. (Note: Some modern historians interpret the sources to indicate that some of Warwick's men-at-arms mounted and attacked the crossbowmen in the flank, driving them off.) Oxford realised the French horses were mostly only barded on their forequarters. He led some of the archers along the edge of the marsh to a position from which they could shoot into the horses' unprotected hindquarters. The French cavalry took heavy casualties and withdrew; Audrehem was captured.

On the English right Clermont advanced more cautiously, not far ahead of Brienne's dismounted troops. He discovered that Salisbury's men were defending a thick hedge with a single passable gap, wide enough for four horses abreast. Already committed to the attack, the French attempted to smash through the men-at-arms defending the gap. The English archers positioned in trenches near and to the right of the hedge are calculated to have fired 50 arrows per second at Clermont's group of cavalry. Gascon crossbowmen joined in; although they had a much lower rate of fire, they could penetrate plate armour at longer ranges. Despite this fire, the cavalry were able to reach the gap in the hedge with few casualties. Here a fierce melee broke out. With the French now halted and at close range, the longbowmen were more effective against them. The French were also heavily outnumbered by the English men-at-arms and were forced back with heavy losses, including Clermont killed.

The sources contain only details concerning the rest of the attack by the first French division, a mixed force of heavy infantry, (Note: That is, non-men-at-arms, who would have been, at least slightly, less well-armoured.) all commoners, and of French and foreign men-at-arms. The bolts from their supporting crossbowmen are recorded as falling thickly, but with the cavalry repulsed the longbowmen turned against them and, having a superior rate of fire, were able to force them to withdraw despite their use of pavises. The division's leader, Brienne, the constable of France, was killed, as was one of Talleyrand's nephews, Robert of Durazzo, who had accompanied the Cardinal during his negotiations. Douglas either fled to save his life or was badly wounded and carried from the field. Given the heavy French casualties, it is assumed the attack was strongly pressed. As some contemporary sources summarise this phase of the fighting with "the first French division was defeated by the arrows of the English" it is also assumed by many modern historians that the longbowmen, still well supplied with ammunition able to punch straight through armour at close range, played a prominent part in the attack's repulse. The Black Prince was infuriated by the participation of Talleyrand's relatives and companions, and when told that a relative of the Cardinal, the châtelain d'Emposte, had been captured he ordered him beheaded; he was rapidly persuaded to withdraw the order by his advisers.

=== Second attack ===
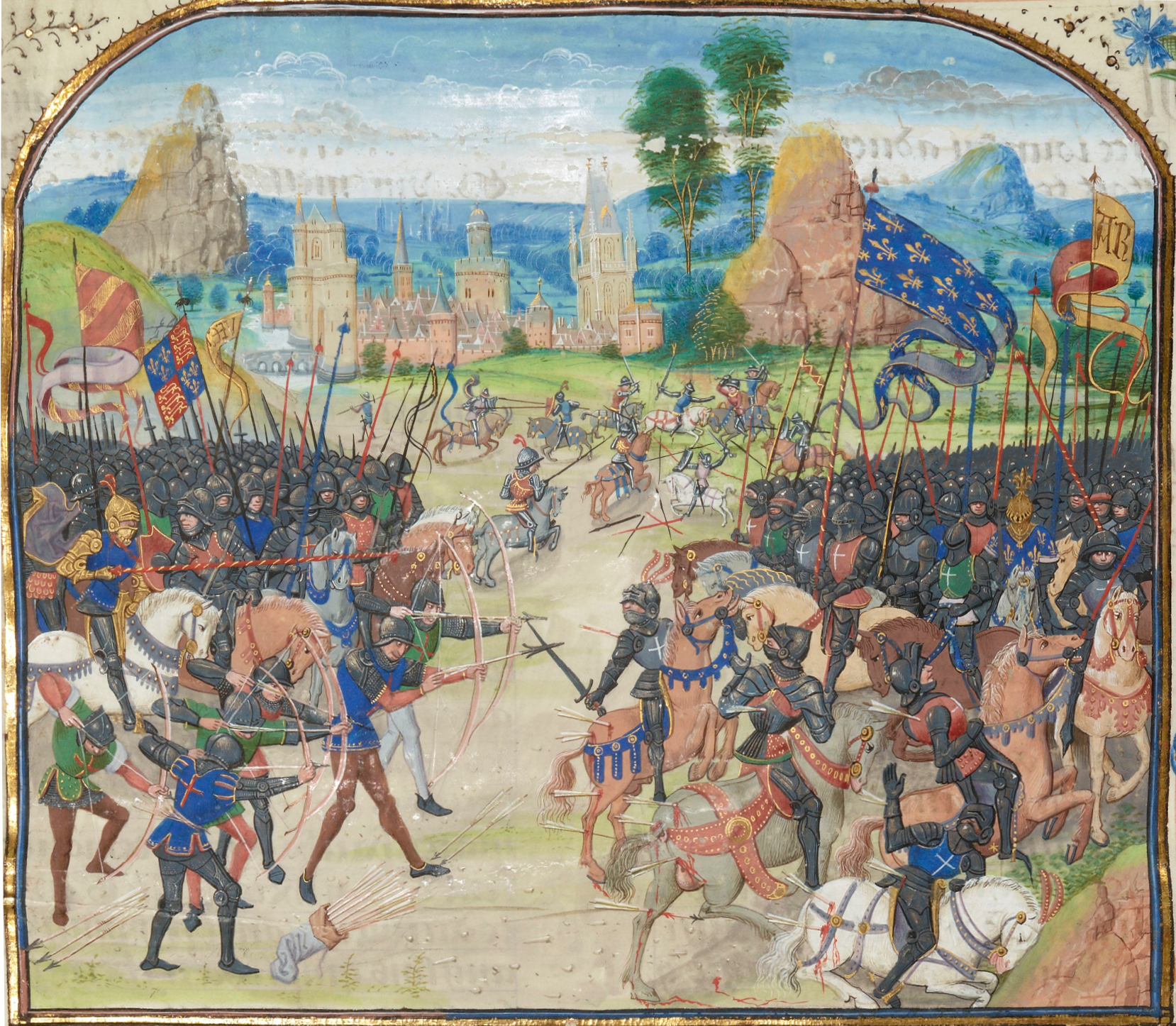
Battle of Poitier, by Loyset Liédet

There was no pursuit of the French survivors of the first attack as they retreated. The English were ordered to hold their positions and to take the opportunity to reform, as the next French division was already moving towards them. This, 4,000 strong, attacked vigorously. The French advanced against the steady fire of the English and Welsh archers, which caused many casualties, and were disordered by the retreating members of the first assault. The French had to force their way through the hedge the English were defending, which put them at a disadvantage, but they closed with the Anglo-Gascons in ferocious hand-to-hand fighting which went on for two hours.

They massed against two gaps in the hedge, on one occasion succeeding in driving back their opponents and breaking through; a force of archers had been deployed to cover this position and their fire cut down the leading Frenchmen, giving the Anglo-Gascons the opportunity to counter-attack and reform their line. Suffolk, aged almost 60, rode behind the Anglo-Gascon line, shouting encouragement, directing reinforcements to threatened points and telling the archers where to direct their fire. Throughout the battle the experienced English and Gascon commanders were able to manoeuvre and redeploy their troops in a way the French were not. The French commanders, mostly, carried out their orders and their men fought with reckless bravery, but they were inflexible. The Anglo-Gascons were able to respond in the heat of battle to French threats. Sumption describes this as "remarkable", David Green refers to "an extremely flexible tactical response". The historian Peter Hoskins states that most of the Anglo-Gascons having served together for a year "contributed to the discipline that the Anglo-Gascons displayed" and suggests that the French attack was ineptly handled.

A contemporary French chronicler described this second attack as "more amazing, harder and more lethal than the others". An English account states "Man fought frenziedly against man, each one striving to bring death to his opponent so that he himself might live." As the fighting went on, the Black Prince was forced to commit almost all of his reserves to reinforce weak spots. Both sides suffered many casualties. Audley was noted for being wounded in the body, head and face, and fighting on for the English. One of the French joint commanders, Bourbon, was killed, and the Dauphin's standard-bearer was captured. The Dauphin was accompanied by two of his brothers, Louis and John, and the trio's advisers and bodyguards were perturbed by the intensity of the fighting in their vicinity and forced them to withdraw from the front line to a safer position. Seeing this, the rest of the division, exhausted after two hours fighting and already demoralised by the death of Bourbon and the loss of the Dauphin's standard, withdrew as well. There was no panic and the disengagement was orderly. The senior surviving commanders of the division confirmed the movement and the surviving men-at-arms marched away from the Anglo-Gascons.

It is unclear if the Anglo-Gascons pursued the French, and if so, to what extent. Some modern historians state that the Anglo-Gascons again remained in their positions, as they had after the repulse of the first French division. Others write of a limited pursuit by individuals breaking ranks or of a full-blooded one by Warwick's division causing many French casualties. In any event, most of the Anglo-Gascons stood their ground, tended their wounded, knifed the French wounded and stripped their bodies and those of the already dead, and recovered what arrows they could find in the immediate vicinity, including those impaling dead and wounded Frenchmen. There were many English and Gascons wounded or dead and those still standing were exhausted from three hours of ferocious and near-continuous fighting.

=== Third attack ===
As the Dauphin's division recoiled there was confusion in the French ranks. The third French division contained 3,200 men-at-arms. Their commander, John's brother the Duke of Orléans, marched away from the battle with half of them and many of the survivors of the first two attacks. The contemporary sources contradict each other regarding the reasons for this. Orléans may have thought that the orderly withdrawal of the Dauphin's division marked a general retreat. There were official accounts after the battle that John had ordered Orléans to escort his four sons to safety, but these were widely disbelieved and rumoured to have been invented after the event to excuse the behaviour of Orléans and the men who had retreated with him. Three of John's four sons, including the Dauphin, did leave the field at this point; one, Philip, returned to his father's side and took part in the final attack. Of the 1,600 men who did not flee the scene, who included some from Orléans' inner circle, many joined the King's division behind. The rest advanced against the Anglo-Gascons and launched a feeble attack, which was repelled easily.

In the aftermath of this failure a number, possibly a large number, of men from Warwick's division left their positions and pursued the French. One motivation for this would have been their intention to take prisoners, the ransoming of whom could be extremely lucrative. Many of the English and Welsh archers again scavenged longbow arrows from the immediate vicinity. Of those men-at-arms who did not pursue, the majority were carrying wounds of varying degrees of severity and treating them was a preoccupation.

=== Fourth attack ===
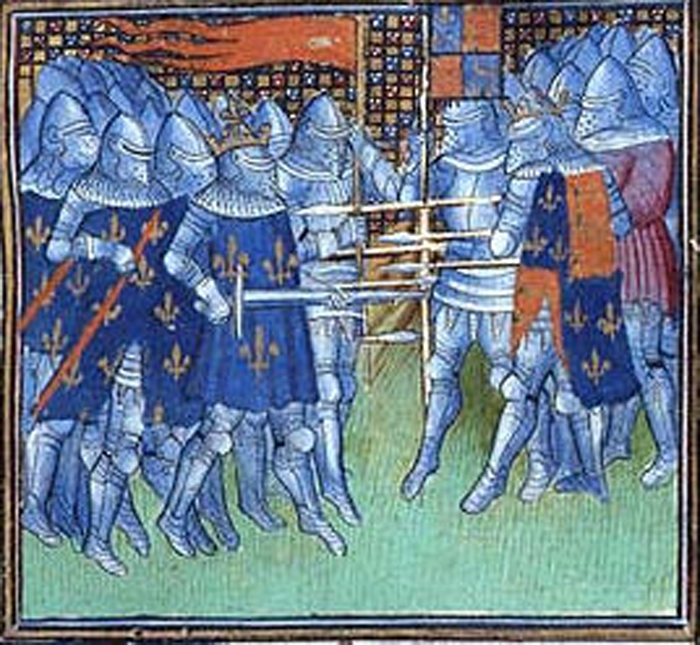
The Battle of Poitiers; the Oriflamme can be seen on the top left.

John's fourth French division had started the battle with 2,000 men-at-arms, including 400 picked men under his personal command. Many of the surviving men-at-arms of the first two attacks had rallied to the King, as had many of those from the third division who had not withdrawn with Orléans. Some survivors of the botched third assault also fell back to join the King. These reinforcements probably brought the number of men-at-arms in the division to about 4,000. John's division also had a large but unspecified number of crossbowmen attached to it, and they had been joined by many surviving crossbowmen from the first attack. Modern scholars differ as to whether the French or the Anglo-Gascons had more men at this stage of the battle. This very large division marched across the one-mile-wide (1,600 m) gap towards the by now exhausted Anglo-Gascons, again all as infantry. The King ordered the French sacred banner, the Oriflamme, to be unfurled, which signalled that no prisoners were to be taken, on pain of death. (Note: One contemporary chronicler wrote that John ordered that the Black Prince alone was to be spared.)

It was normal for medieval armies to form up in three divisions; having overcome three French divisions, many in the Anglo-Gascon army thought the battle was over. The sight of a further major force, under the royal standard and with the Oriflamme flying, dispirited them. One chronicler reports the Black Prince prayed aloud as this last division approached. The Prince harangued his exhausted men in an attempt to stiffen their morale, but they remained doubtful of their ability to repulse the approaching force. The Anglo-Gascon command group conferred. It seemed probable that if they stood to face a fourth attack they would be defeated. They decided to attempt a stratagem. Perhaps remembering a similar ploy by a French force at the 1349 Battle of Lunalonge it was agreed to send a small mounted group under the Gascon lord Jean, the Captal de Buch, on a circuitous march around the French flank in an attempt to launch a surprise attack on the French rear. The account by one contemporary chronicler that all of the Anglo-Gascon men-at-arms remounted at this point is generally discounted by modern historians. Some modern sources have a force of volunteers led by the wounded Audley mounting and being tasked with launching an attack against King John personally once the two forces came to battle – only 4 men by some modern accounts, 400 in others. The modern historian Michael Jones describes this as a "suicide mission". Other modern sources maintain that other than the Captal de Buch's small force all of the Anglo-Gascons remained dismounted.

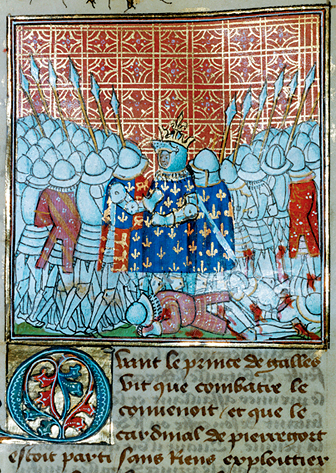
John II being captured

The sight of the Captal de Buch and his men making for the rear further disheartened the Anglo-Gascons, who believed that they were fearfully escaping an inevitable defeat. Some men fled. Concerned his army would break and rout in the face of the French assault, the Black Prince gave the order for a general advance. This bolstered Anglo-Gascon morale and shook the French. Discipline reasserted itself and the Anglo-Gascons moved forward, out of their defensive positions. The French crossbowmen advanced in front of their men-at-arms, and as the English longbowmen on the flanks of the Anglo-Gascon men-at-arms came within range they attempted to establish fire superiority. The French crossbow bolts are said to have "darkened the sky". The men firing them were able to shelter behind pavises and the English archers were running short of arrows after the desperate fighting of the morning. Nevertheless, the English were able to largely suppress this fire until the crossbowmen drew aside to let the French men-at-arms through for their final charge. As the English archers expended the last of their ammunition these 4,000 or so men-at-arms attempted to use their shields, ducked their heads against the arrows and charged home into the survivors of the 3,000 English and Gascon men-at-arms who had started the battle. The longbowmen threw their bows aside and joined the melee armed with swords and hand axes.

Battle was again joined, with fierce fighting. The impetus of the Anglo-Gascon charge was halted by the French, who slowly got the better of the struggle. Rogers is of the opinion that the French would have won this fight if no other factors had intervened. The Anglo-Gascon line was starting to break when it was reinforced by men of Warwick's division returning from their pursuit. This heartened the Anglo-Gascons and discouraged the French. If it occurred, it was at this point that Audley led a cavalry charge aimed directly at the French king. The fighting continued, with the French focused on the opponents in front of them. With the battle in the balance, the Captal de Buch's 160 men arrived undetected in the French rear. His 100 archers (Note: Modern accounts differ as to whether these were longbowmen or Gascon crossbowmen. Many simply describe them as "archers".) dismounted and opened an effective fire into the French rear – a contemporary account states they "greatly and horribly pierced" the French – and his 60 mounted men-at-arms charged into the rear of the French line.

Then the standards wavered and the standard-bearers fell. Some were trampled, their innards torn open, and others spat out their own teeth. Many were stuck fast to the ground, impaled. Not a few lost whole arms as they stood there. Some died, swallowing in the blood of others, some groaned, crushed beneath the heavy weight of the fallen, mightly souls gave forth fearful lamentations as they departed from wretched bodies.

— Geoffrey le Baker

The 2,000 men who had originally made up John's division were all assigned to its front line when it advanced. Men who joined after their original divisions had been defeated in one of the previous three attacks filled in behind them. They were more tired than those in the front ranks and, having already having taken part in a failed assault, their morale was brittle. Dismayed by Warwick's reinforcement and shocked by the Captal de Buch's sudden arrival behind them, some started to run from the field. Once this movement had started others copied them and the division fell apart. Most of the first to run were able to reach their horses and escape, as the Anglo-Gascons concentrated on dealing with their enemies who were still fighting. These were pushed back as the Anglo-Gascons were reinvigorated by the prospect of victory. The French still fighting around their King were forced into a loop of the River Miosson, known as the Champ d'Alexandre. By now they had been surrounded and split into small groups.

Many of these men were the elite of the French army: John's personal bodyguards, senior nobles or members of the Order of the Star. (The latter had all sworn not to retreat from a battle. (Note: The order was all but wiped out at Poitiers.)) The fighting was brutal as these men refused to surrender. Their cause was clearly hopeless and the Anglo-Gascons were eager to take them prisoner – in order that they could be ransomed – rather than kill them, so many were captured. The standard-bearer of the Oriflamme was killed and the sacred banner captured. Surrounded by enemies, John and his youngest son, Philip, surrendered.

=== Mopping up ===
Frenchmen who had fled soon after the Captal de Buch's force arrived generally reached their horses and were able to escape. Once John's division was clearly retreating many Anglo-Gascons mounted and pursued. A large number pursued the Frenchmen fleeing towards what they thought was the safety of Poitiers. Its citizens, fearing the Anglo-Gascons, had closed the gates and manned the walls, and refused access. The mounted Anglo-Gascons caught the French soldiers as they milled outside the gate and slaughtered them. The lack of mention of any quarter being offered suggests that the French were common soldiers, rather than men-at-arms whom it would have been financially advantageous to capture in order to hold for ransom. The French camp was overrun by Anglo-Gascon cavalry. Elsewhere the Anglo-Gascons spread out in a helter-skelter chase. French men-at-arms who failed to reach their horses were captured or, occasionally, killed. Those who did mount were frequently pursued: some were caught and captured, some fought off their pursuers, (Note: At least two Englishmen were captured by fleeing Frenchmen after coming to blows.) while most escaped. It was evening before the last Anglo-Gascons returned to their camp with their prisoners.

=== Casualties ===
According to different modern sources 2,000 to 3,000 French men-at-arms and either 500 or 800 common soldiers were taken prisoner during the battle. As well as the King and his youngest son they included the archbishop of Sens, one of the two marshals of France, and the seneschals of Saintonge, Tours and Poitou. Approximately 2,500 French men-at-arms were killed, as were 3,300 common soldiers according to English accounts or 700 by French ones. Among the slain were the French King's uncle; the grand constable of France; the other marshal; the Bishop of Châlons; and John's standard bearer, Geoffroi de Charny. (Note: Charny was also one of John's most skilled and valued advisers.) A contemporary opined that the French had suffered "a great harm, a great pity, and damage irreparable". The Anglo-Gascons suffered many wounded but reported a mere 40 to 60 killed, of whom only 4 were men-at-arms. Hoskins comments that these "seem improbably low". Modern sources estimate Anglo-Gascon fatalities at about 40 men-at-arms and an uncertain but much larger number of bowmen and other infantry.

== Aftermath ==
=== March to Bordeaux ===
The French were concerned the victorious Anglo-Gascons would attempt to storm Poitiers or other towns, or continue their devastation. The Black Prince was more concerned with getting his army with its prisoners and loot safely back to Gascony. He was aware many Frenchmen had survived the battle, but unaware of their state of cohesion or morale. The Anglo-Gascons moved 3 miles (5 km) south on 20 September and tended the wounded, buried the dead, paroled some of their prisoners, and reorganised their formations. On 21 September the Anglo-Gascons continued their interrupted march south, travelling slowly, overladen as they were with plunder and prisoners. On 2 October they entered Libourne and rested while a triumphal entrance was arranged at Bordeaux. Two weeks later the Black Prince escorted John into Bordeaux amid ecstatic scenes.

=== Peace ===
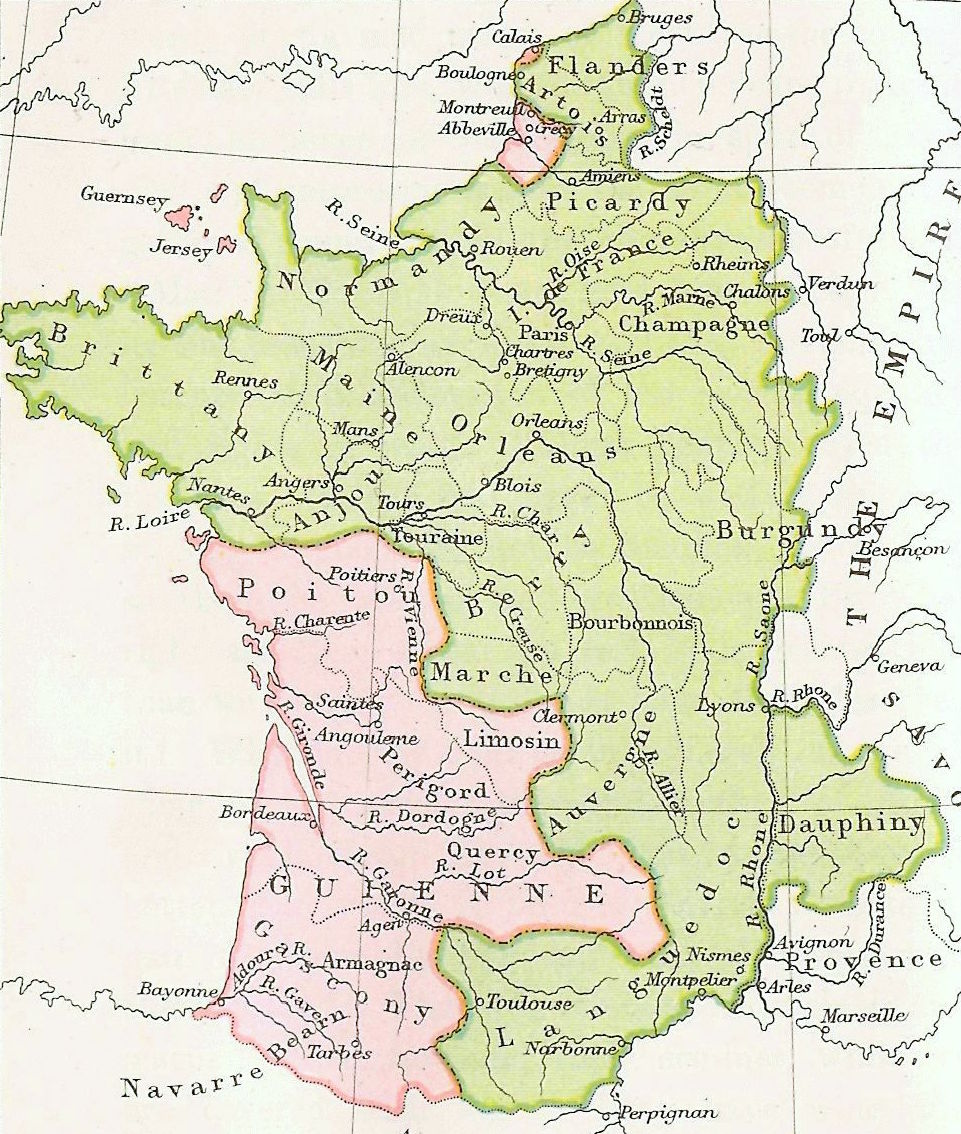
France after the 1360 Treaty of Brétigny; French territory in green, English territory in pink

The Black Prince's chevauchée is described by Rogers as "the most important campaign of the Hundred Years' War". In its aftermath English and Gascon forces raided widely across France, against little or no opposition. With no effective central authority France dissolved into near anarchy. In March 1357 a truce was agreed for two years. In April the Black Prince sailed for England, accompanied by his prisoner, John, and landed at Plymouth on 5 May. They proceeded to London and a rapturous reception. Protracted negotiations between John and Edward III led to the First Treaty of London in May 1358, which would have ended the war with a large transfer of French territory to England and the payment of a ransom for John's freedom. The French government was unenthusiastic and was anyway unable to raise the first instalment of the ransom, causing the treaty to lapse. A peasant revolt known as the jacquerie broke out in northern France during the spring of 1358 and was bloodily put down in June. At length John and Edward agreed the Second Treaty of London, which was similar to the first except that even larger swathes of French territory would be transferred to the English. In May 1359 this was similarly rejected by the Dauphin and the Estates General.

In October 1359 Edward III led another campaign in northern France. It was unopposed by French forces but was unable to take any strongly fortified places. Instead the English army spread out and for six months devastated much of the region. Both countries were finding it almost impossible to finance continued hostilities, but neither was inclined to change their attitude to the proposed peace terms. On 13 April 1360, near Chartres, a sharp fall in temperature and a heavy hail storm killed many English baggage horses and some soldiers. Taking this as a sign from God, Edward reopened negotiations, directly with the Dauphin. By 8 May the Treaty of Brétigny had been agreed, which largely replicated the First Treaty of London or the Treaty of Guînes. By this treaty vast areas of France were ceded to England, to be personally ruled by the Black Prince, and John was ransomed for three million gold écu. Rogers states "Edward gained territories comprising a full third of France, to be held in full sovereignty, along with a huge ransom for the captive King John – his original war aims and much more." As well as John, sixteen of the more senior nobles captured at Poitiers were finally released with the sealing of this treaty. At the time it seemed this was the end of the war, but large-scale fighting broke out again in 1369 and the Hundred Years' War did not end until 1453, with a French victory which left only Calais in English hands.

== Notes, citations and sources ==
=== Sources ===
- Bachrach, Bernard S. & Bachrach, David S. (2017). Warfare in Medieval Europe c. 400–c. 1453. Abingdon, Oxfordshire; New York: Routledge. ISBN 978-1-138-88765-7.
- Burne, Alfred (1999) [1955]. The Crecy War. Ware, Hertfordshire: Wordsworth Editions. ISBN 978-1-84022-210-4.
- Curry, Anne (2002). The Hundred Years' War 1337–1453. Oxford: Osprey Publishing. ISBN 978-1-84176-269-2.
- Deaux, George (1969). The Black Death, 1347. London: Hamilton. OCLC 242352826.
- Edge, David & Paddock, John (1988). Arms & Armor of the Medieval Knight. New York: Crescent Books. ISBN 978-0-517-64468-3.
- Fowler, Kenneth (1961). Henry of Grosmont, First Duke of Lancaster, 1310–1361 (PDF) (PhD thesis). Leeds: University of Leeds. OCLC 1064545536.
- Fowler, Kenneth (1969). The King's Lieutenant: Henry of Grosmont, First Duke of Lancaster, 1310–1361. New York: Barnes & Noble. ISBN 978-0-389-01003-6.
- Given-Wilson, Chris & Bériac, Françoise (2001). "Edward III's Prisoners of War: The Battle of Poitiers and its Context". The English Historical Review. 112 (468): 802–833. doi:10.1093/ehr/CXVI.468.802. ISSN 0013-8266. JSTOR 579193.
- Green, David (2011). The Black Prince. New York: History Press. ISBN 978-0-7524-7306-2.
- Green, David (2013). The Battle of Poitiers 1356. New York: History Press. ISBN 978-0-7524-9634-4.
- Harari, Yuval Noah (1999). "Inter-frontal Cooperation in the Fourteenth Century and Edward III's 1346 Campaign". War in History. 6 (4): 379–395. doi:10.1177/096834459900600401. JSTOR 26013966. S2CID 59055741.
- Harari, Yuval N. (2007). Special Operations in the Age of Chivalry, 1100–1550. Woodbridge, Suffolk: Boydell Press. ISBN 978-1-84383-292-8.
- Hindley, Geoffrey (1971). Medieval Warfare. New York: G. P. Putnam's Sons. OCLC 317845662.
- Hoskins, Peter (2011). In the Steps of the Black Prince: The Road to Poitiers, 1355–1356. Woodbridge, Suffolk: Boydell. ISBN 978-1-84383-611-7.
- Jones, Michael J. (2019). The Black Prince : England's Greatest Medieval Warrior. New York: Pegasus. ISBN 978-1-64313-229-7.
- Kaeuper, Richard W. & Kennedy, Elspeth (1996). The Book of Chivalry of Geoffroi de Charny: Text, Context, and Translation. Philadelphia: University of Pennsylvania Press. ISBN 978-0-8122-3348-3.
- King, Andy (2017). "'Then a Great Misfortune Befell Them': the Laws of War on Surrender and the Killing of Prisoners on the Battlefield in the Hundred Years War" (PDF). Journal of Medieval History. 43 (1): 106–117. doi:10.1080/03044181.2016.1236502. S2CID 159619516. Archived from the original (PDF) on 22 October 2019.
- Livingstone, Marilyn & Witzel, Morgen (2018). The Black Prince and the Capture of a King, Poitiers 1356. Oxford; Havertown, Pennsylvania: Casemate. ISBN 978-1-61200-452-5.
- Madden, Mollie Marie (2014). The Black Prince at War: The Anatomy of a Chevauchée (PDF) (PhD thesis). Minnesota: University of Minnesota. OCLC 1194717646.
- Magier, Mariusz; Nowak, Adrian; et al. (2017). "Numerical Analysis of English Bows used in Battle of Crécy". Problemy Techniki Uzbrojenia. 142 (2): 69–85. doi:10.5604/01.3001.0010.5152. ISSN 1230-3801.
- Mallett, Michael (1974). Mercenaries and their Masters: Warfare in Renaissance Italy. London: Bodley Head. ISBN 978-0-370-10502-4.
- Mitchell, Russell (2008). "The Longbow-Crossbow Shootout at Crécy (1346): Has the "Rate of Fire Commonplace" Been Overrated?". In L. J. Andrew Villalon & Donald J. Kagay (eds.). The Hundred Years War (Part II): Different Vistas. Leiden: Brill. pp. 233–257. ISBN 978-90-04-16821-3.
- Nicolle, David (2004). Poitiers 1356: The Capture of a King (PDF). Oxford: Osprey Publishing. ISBN 978-1-84176-516-7. Archived from the original (PDF) on 5 February 2019.
- Pratt, P. L. (2010). "Testing the Bows". In Hardy, Robert (ed.). Longbow: A Social and Military History. Yeovil, Somerset: Haynes Publishing. pp. 205–217. ISBN 978-1-85260-620-6.
- Prestwich, Michael (2007). Plantagenet England 1225–1360. Oxford: Oxford University Press. ISBN 978-0-19-922687-0.
- Rodger, N. A. M. (2004). The Safeguard of the Sea. London: Penguin. ISBN 978-0-14-029724-9.
- Rogers, Clifford J. (1994). "Edward III and the Dialectics of Strategy, 1327–1360". Transactions of the Royal Historical Society. 4: 83–102. doi:10.2307/3679216. JSTOR 3679216. OCLC 931311378. S2CID 163041276.
- Rogers, Clifford J. (1998). "The Efficacy of the English Longbow: A Reply to Kelly DeVries" (PDF). War in History. 5 (2): 233–242. doi:10.1177/096834459800500205. ISSN 0968-3445. S2CID 161286935. Archived from the original (PDF) on 3 February 2019.
- Rogers, Clifford J. (2004). Bachrach, Bernard S.; DeVries, Kelly & Rogers, Clifford J (eds.). "The Bergerac Campaign (1345) and the Generalship of Henry of Lancaster". Journal of Medieval Military History. II. Woodbridge, Suffolk: Boydell & Brewer. ISBN 978-1-84383-040-5. ISSN 0961-7582.
- Rogers, Clifford J. (2014) [2000]. War Cruel and Sharp: English Strategy under Edward III, 1327–1360. Woodbridge, Suffolk: Boydell Press. ISBN 978-0-85115-804-4.
- Rothero, Christopher (1995). The Armies of Crécy and Poitiers. London: Osprey. ISBN 978-0-85045-393-5.
- Strickland, Matthew & Hardy, Robert (2011). The Great Warbow: From Hastings to the Mary Rose. Somerset: J. H. Haynes & Co. ISBN 978-0-85733-090-1.
- Sumption, Jonathan (1990). Trial by Battle. The Hundred Years' War. Vol. I. London: Faber and Faber. ISBN 978-0-571-20095-5.
- Sumption, Jonathan (1999). Trial by Fire. The Hundred Years' War. Vol. II. London: Faber and Faber. ISBN 978-0-571-13896-8.
- Wagner, John A. (2006). "Chevauchée of 1355". Encyclopedia of the Hundred Years War. Woodbridge, Suffolk: Greenwood. pp. 95–96. ISBN 978-0-313-32736-0.
- Wagner, John A. (2006a). "Armies, Composition of". Encyclopedia of the Hundred Years War. Woodbridge, Suffolk: Greenwood. pp. 21–23. ISBN 978-0-313-32736-0.
- Wagner, John A. (2006b). "Charles the Bad, King of Navarre (1332–1387)". Encyclopedia of the Hundred Years War. Woodbridge, Suffolk: Greenwood. pp. 93–94. ISBN 978-0-313-32736-0.
- Wagner, John A. (2006c). "Guines, Treaty of". Encyclopedia of the Hundred Years War. Woodbridge, Suffolk: Greenwood. pp. 142–143. ISBN 978-0-313-32736-0.
- Wagner, John A. (2006d). "Poitiers, Battle of". Encyclopedia of the Hundred Years War. Woodbridge, Suffolk: Greenwood. pp. 256–258. ISBN 978-0-313-32736-0.
- Wagner, John A. (2006e). "Black Death". Encyclopedia of the Hundred Years War. Woodbridge, Suffolk: Greenwood. pp. 53–54. ISBN 978-0-313-32736-0.
