= Reims campaign =

1359–60 Hundred Years' War campaign

- Part of the Hundred Years' War
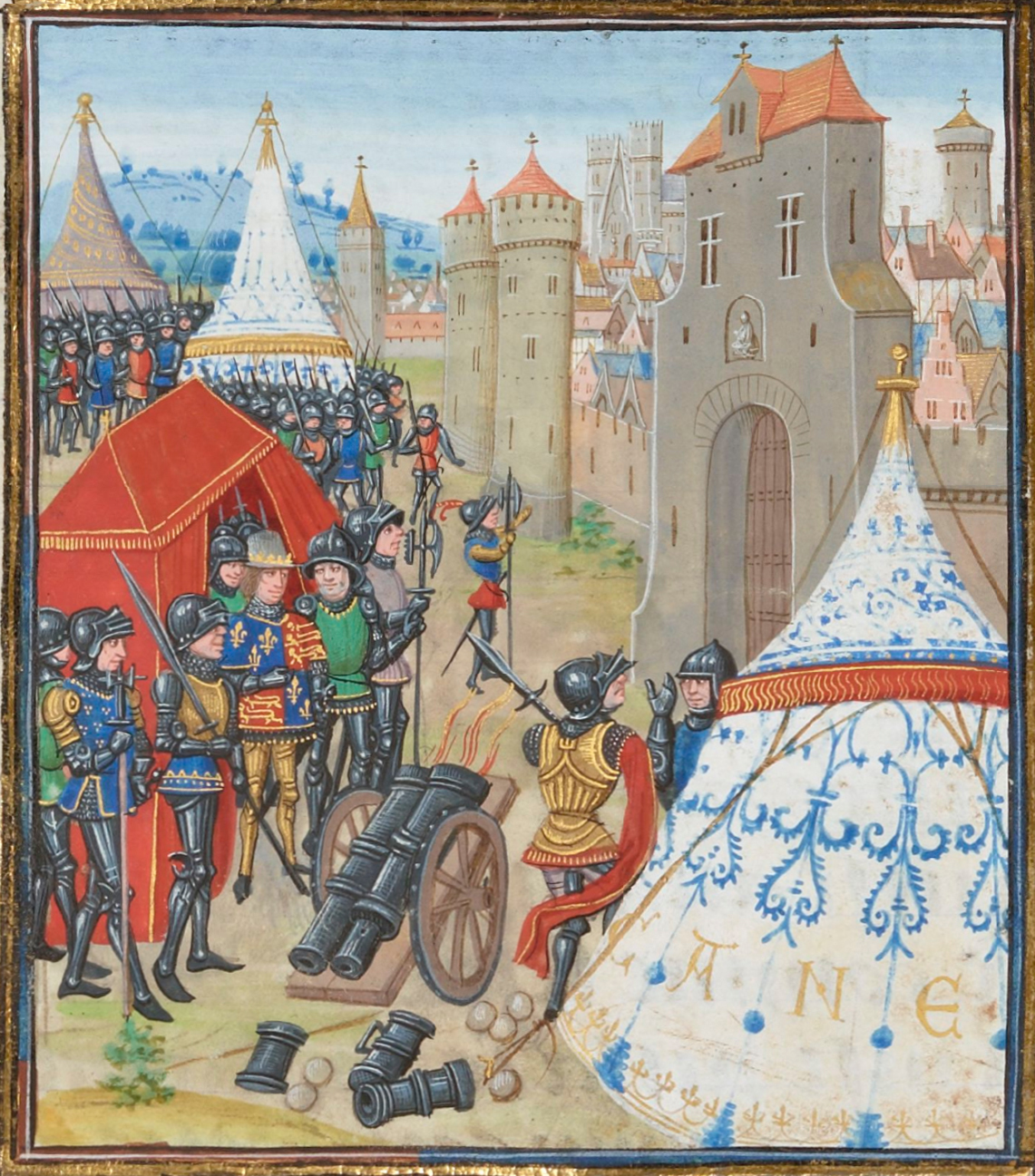
- Edward III before Reims
Date	28 October 1359 – 8 May 1360
Location	Champagne, Burgundy and Beauce 50.9580°N 1.8530°E
Result	French Victory: English campaign frustrated; Treaty of Brétigny

Belligerents
Kingdom of England	Kingdom of France

Commanders and leaders
Edward III; Edward, the Black Prince; Duke of Lancaster; Earl of Warwick	Dauphin Charles

The Reims campaign took place during the Hundred Years' War. It occurred after the French de facto government rejected the terms of the Treaty of London and consequently Edward III of England organised and commanded an expeditionary army to gain by force what he had failed to win by diplomacy. On 28 October 1359 Edward landed at Calais, and advanced to Reims, where he hoped to be crowned king of France. The strenuous resistance of the citizens frustrated this scheme, and Edward marched into Burgundy, and then he made his way back towards Paris. Failing in an attack on the capital, he was glad to conclude, on 8 May 1360, preliminaries of peace at Brétigny, near Chartres. This treaty, less onerous to France than that of London, took its final form when Edward and John ratified the treaty in Calais on 9 October 1360. By it Edward renounced his claim to France in return for Aquitaine and other French territories in full sovereignty.

== Prelude ==
After his defeat and capture at the Battle of Poitiers (19 September 1356), King John II of France accompanied the Black Prince to England, where he remained a prisoner of Edward III of England.

In March 1359 the Treaty of London was made between the kings of France and England by which John, who was still a prisoner in England, surrendered to Edward the whole of the south-west of France from Poitou to Gascony, with Calais, Guisnes, and Ponthieu in full sovereignty, and was to ransom himself and his lords for four million crowns, while Edward gave up his claims to the crown and the provinces north of the Loire, formerly held by his ancestors. France's bargaining position was very weak already after the Battle of Poitiers, and after the Jacquerie and the rebellion of Etienne Marcel in Paris it was further weakened. This treaty was however repudiated by Charles, the regent of France, with the consent of the Estates General, and so Edward prepared for war.

The Flemings, who were now on good terms with their count, Louis II, Count of Flanders, had deserted the English alliance and now drove the English merchants into Brabant. On the other hand Sir Robert Knolles and other leaders of the free companies that desolated France put themselves under Edward's command, and so many foreign lords and knights flocked to Calais to serve under him, that he was forced to send Henry, Duke of Lancaster to satisfy them by leading them on a plundering expedition.

== Expedition ==
Having raised an immense force, and furnished it with everything that could be needed during a long campaign, Edward III sailed from Sandwich on 28 October 1359 and arrived at Calais the same day. The adventurers who had gained little booty by their raid, were clamorous for pay, but he told them that he had nothing for them, and that they might please themselves as to serving under him, though he would give those who did so a good share of the spoil. He marched through Artois and Cambresis to Reims, where he intended to be crowned king of France, and laid siege to the city on 30 November. Charles, the regent of France, did not attack him, but the city was strong and as his men suffered from the weather and bad quarters he broke up the siege on 11 January 1360, led his army into Burgundy, and took Tonnerre, where his soldiers were refreshed with three thousand butts of wine. After remaining there some days he removed to Guillen on the borders of the duchy, encamped there on 19 February, and remained till mid-Lent.

On 10 March 1360, Duke Philip bought Edward III off by a payment of two hundred thousand gold 'moutons', and he then marched to Paris and encamped between Montlhéry and Châtres, lodging at the castle of Saint-Germain-lès-Arpajon. Edward did not succeed in provoking Charles, the regent of France, to battle, and on 6 April marched towards the Loire, intending to refresh his men in Brittany and commence operations again later in the year. However, on 13 April 1360 (Black Monday), the English army was hit by a hailstorm and suffered a loss of over 1,000. Meanwhile, on 15 March, a French fleet had appeared at Winchelsea, carrying a large force of soldiers, who plundered the town and were at last driven to their ships.

These events improved the French position and Charles, the regent of France, now pressed for peace. The Black Prince took the principal part on the English side in the negotiations, and the preliminary truce arranged at Chartres on 7 May 1360 was drawn up by proctors acting in his name and the name of Charles, Duke of Normandy, the regent of France. The terms of the Treaty of Brétigny at Brétigny, near Chartres were agreed on 8 May.

== Aftermath ==
By the terms of the Treaty of Brétigny the whole of the ancient province of Aquitaine, together with Calais, Guisnes, and Ponthieu, was ceded to Edward. Edward renounced his claim to the crown, to the provinces north of the Loire, and to the overlordship of Flanders. The right to Brittany was left undecided, and provision was made that any future struggle for the duchy between the two competitors should not involve a breach of the treaty. The ransom to be paid for King John II, was fixed at three million gold crowns, at an exchange rate of two to the noble, six thousand to be paid in four months, and hostages to be delivered, and the king to be then set free. It is noted that a nineteen or twenty year old Geoffrey Chaucer was captured at this siege but was ransomed by Edward III for £16. These terms were slightly more favourable to the French compared to the Treaty of London.

Edward returned thanks in the cathedral of Chartres, and then embarked at Honfleur, landing at Rye on 18 May. On 9 October Edward crossed to Calais, and on the 24 October, with some amendments, finally ratified the Treaty of Brétigny, in the church of Saint-Nicolas, received payment and hostages, and liberating John II, to whom he accorded the title of king of France. Edward returned to England at the beginning of November and kept Christmas at Woodstock.
