= Brétigny, Eure-et-Loir =

Brétigny
- Village
- Location within Centre-Val de Loire Location within France
- Coordinates: 48°25′15.09″N 1°34′16.18″E
- Country: France
- Region: Centre-Val de Loire
- Department: Eure-et-Loir
- Commune: Sours

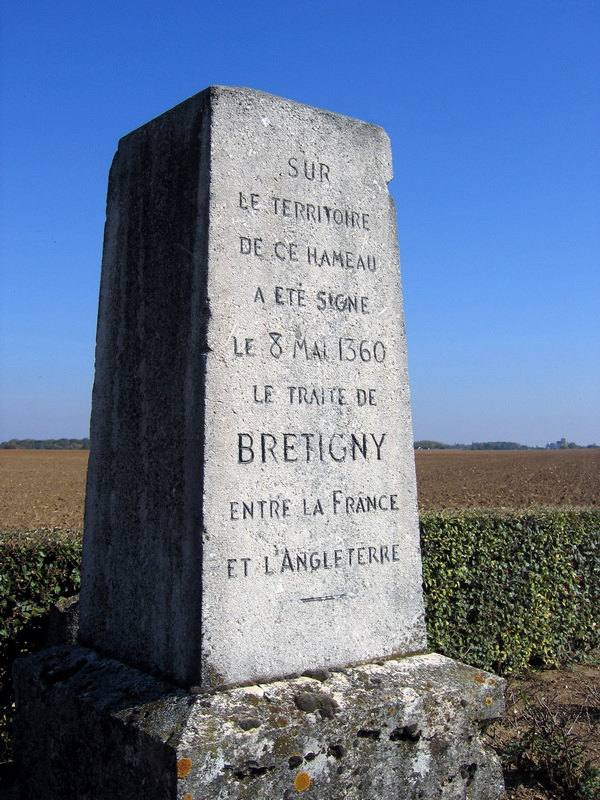
Stela commemorating the Treaty of Brétigny, Sours, Eure-et-Loir, France.

Brétigny (French pronunciation: [bʁetiɲi]) is a village in the commune of Sours, near Chartres, in Eure-et-Loir department, France. It is notable as the place in which the 1360 Treaty of Brétigny was signed, which ended the first phase of the Hundred Years' War.
