= Morgen Witzel =

Canadian historian, business theorist, consultant, lecturer and author

Morgen Witzel (born 1960) is a Canadian historian, business theorist, consultant, lecturer and author of management books, especially known from his work on "Doing business in China" and on "Managing in virtual organizations".

== Biography ==
Witzel grew up in Salmon Arm in the Canadian province of British Columbia, and received his BA in history in 1982 and his MA in Renaissance History in 1984 both from the University of Victoria.

Witzel had started as journalist at a Weekly newspaper in Salmon Arm. After graduation, he started as independent researcher and writer, and started some research and publishing partnerships. In 1995 he moved to the United Kingdom, where he was lecturer at the London Business School from 1995 to 1999. With Tim Ambler he participated in the Doing Business in China course on the MBA Programme, which eventually also resulted in their 2008 book Doing business in China.

Early 2000s Witzel focussed on research, editing and writing books, among other for Continuum International Publishing Group, Routledge and Thomson Reuters. He has been lecturer at other business schools, and consultant for many companies. Since 2011 he is Fellow at the University of Exeter Business School in the Centre for Leadership Studies.

== Selected publications ==
Books

- Tarbell, Ida Minerva, and Morgen Witzel. New ideals in business. Thoemmes, 2002.
- Warner, Malcolm, and Morgen Witzel. Managing in virtual organizations. CengageBrain. com, 2004.
- Witzel, Morgen. Fifty key figures in management. Routledge, 2004.
- Ambler, T., Witzel, M., Xi, C., & Chao, X. I. Doing business in China. Routledge, 2008.
- Witzel, Morgen, and Malcolm Warner (editors). The Oxford Handbook of Management Theorists. Oxford University Press, 2013, 2014.

Articles, a selection:

- Witzel, Morgen L. "The failure of an internal market: The universities funding council bid system." Public Money & Management 11.2 (1991): 41–48.
- Witzel, Morgen. "A short history of efficiency." Business Strategy Review 13.4 (2002): 38–47.
