= Treaty of Brétigny =

1360 treaty between England and France

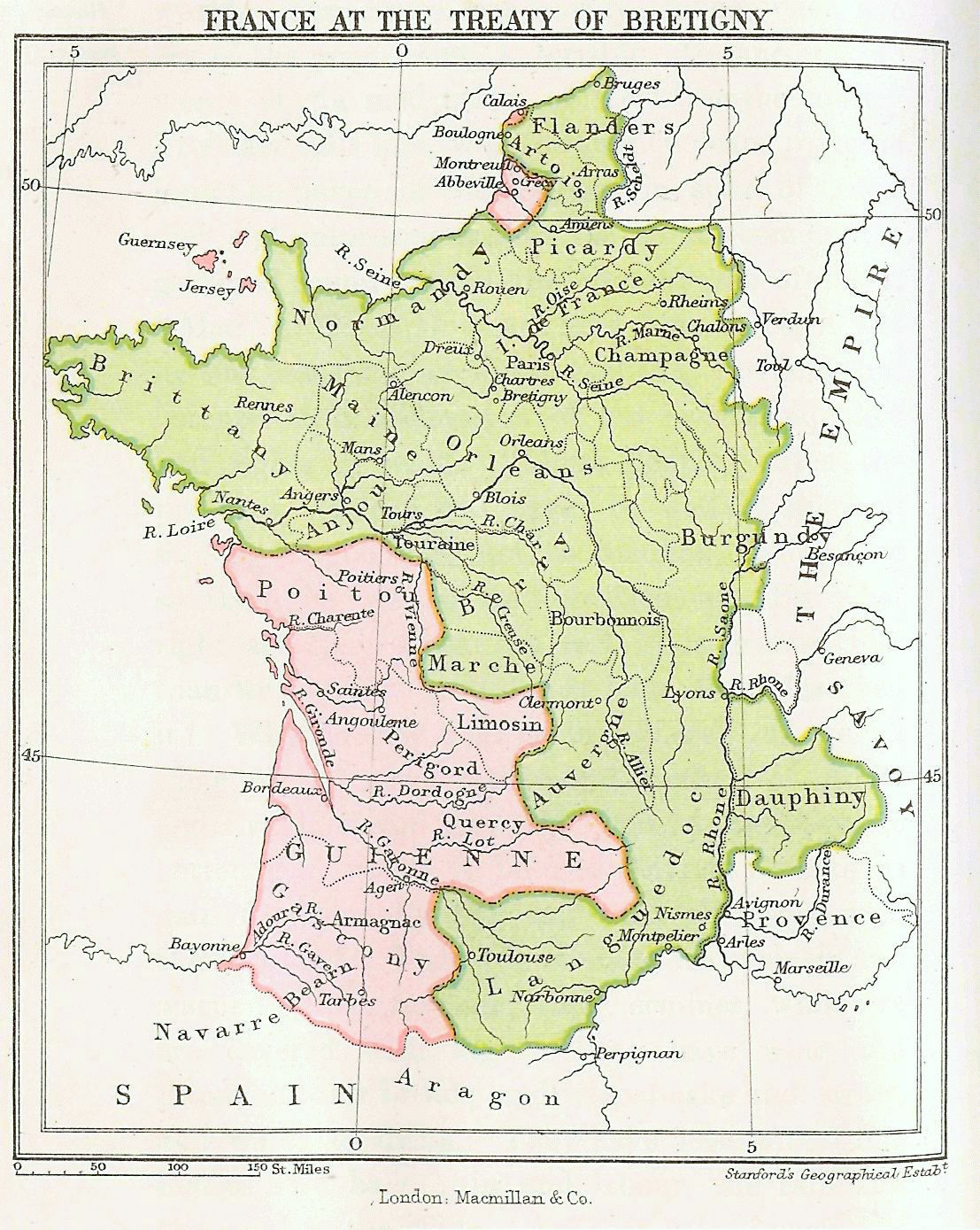
France after the Treaty of Brétigny: French territory in green, English territory in pink

The Treaty of Brétigny was a treaty, drafted on 8 May 1360 and ratified on 24 October 1360, between Kings Edward III of England and John II of France. In retrospect, it is seen as having marked the end of the first phase of the Hundred Years' War (1337–1453).

It was signed at Brétigny, a village near Chartres, and was later ratified as the Treaty of Calais on 24 October 1360.

== Background ==
King John II of France, taken as a prisoner of war at the Battle of Poitiers (19 September 1356), worked with King Edward III of England to write out the Treaty of London. The treaty was condemned by the French Estates-General, who advised the Dauphin Charles to reject it.

In response, Edward, who wished to yield few of the advantages claimed in the abortive Treaty of London the year before, besieged Rheims. The siege lasted until January and with supplies running low, Edward withdrew to Burgundy. After the English army attempted a futile siege of Paris, Edward marched to Chartres, and discussion of terms began in early April. (Note: Ormrod states the negotiations began on 1 May 1360)

== Terms ==
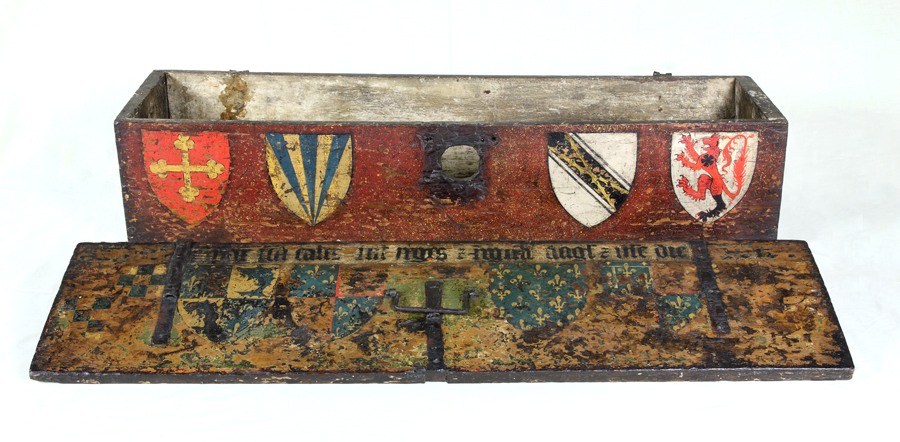
Treaty of Calais Chest in the National Archives, Kew

The Treaty of Brétigny was drafted on 10 May 1360, by Dauphin Charles and six English knights at the Hôtel de Sens. On 14 June 1360, John II, a prisoner in England, ratified the treaty at a banquet attended by Edward III, his son the Prince of Wales, and the other French prisoners from the Battle of Poitiers. The finalization of the treaty would occur in Calais on 24 October 1360.

By the terms of this treaty, Edward III obtained Guyenne, Gascony, Poitou, Saintonge and Aunis, Agenais, Périgord, Limousin, Quercy, Bigorre, the countship of Gauré, Angoumois, Rouergue, Montreuil-sur-Mer, Ponthieu, Calais, Sangatte, Ham and the countship of Guînes. The king of England was to hold these free and clear, without doing homage for them. Furthermore, the treaty established that title to 'all the islands that the king of England now holds' would no longer be under the suzerainty of the king of France. The title duke of Aquitaine was abandoned in favour of lord of Aquitaine.

For his part, the king of England renounced all claims to the French throne. The terms of Brétigny were meant to untangle the feudal responsibilities that had caused so much conflict, and, as far as the English were concerned, would concentrate English territories in an expanded version of Aquitaine. England also restored the rights of the bishop of Coutances to Alderney, which had been removed by the king of England in 1228.

John II had to pay three million écus for his ransom, and would be released after he paid one million. The occasion was the first minting of the franc, equivalent to one livre tournois (twenty sous). As a guarantee for the payment of his ransom, John gave as hostages two of his sons, Dukes Louis I of Anjou and John of Berry, several princes and nobles, four inhabitants of Paris, and two citizens from each of the nineteen principal towns of France.

== Breakdown ==
While the hostages were held, John returned to France to try to raise funds to pay the ransom. In 1362, John's son, Louis of Anjou, a hostage in English-held Calais, escaped captivity. Thus, with his stand-in hostage gone, John felt honour-bound to return to captivity in England. He died in captivity in 1364 and was succeeded by his son, Charles V. In 1369, on the pretext that Edward III had failed to observe the terms of the treaty, the king of France declared war once again.

By the time of the death of the Black Prince in 1376 and the death of Edward III in 1377, English forces had been pushed back into their territories in the southwest, around Bordeaux.

== Legacy ==
The treaty did not lead to lasting peace, but procured nine years' respite from the Hundred Years' War. In the following years, French forces were involved in battles against the Anglo-Navarrese (Bertrand du Guesclin's victory at Cocherel on 16 May 1364) and the Bretons.

== See also ==
- List of treaties
- Treaty of Troyes

== Sources ==
- Bombi, Barbara (2019). Anglo-Papal Relations in the Early Fourteenth Century: A Study in Medieval Diplomacy. Oxford University Press.
- Curry, Anne (2003). The Hundred Years War. Palgrave Macmillan.
- Goodman, Anthony (2014). John of Gaunt: The Exercise of Princely Power in Fourteenth-Century Europe. Taylor & Francis.
- Guignebert, Charles (1930). A Short History of the French People. Vol 1. F. G. Richmond Translator. New York: Macmillan and Company. Archived from the original on 19 June 2013 – via Questia.
- Le Patourel, John (1960). "The Treaty of Brétigny, 1360". Transactions of the Royal Historical Society. 10. doi:10.2307/3678772. ISSN 0080-4401.
- Ormrod, W. Mark (2012). Edward III. Yale University Press.
- Prestwich, Michael (1980). The Three Edwards: War and State in England, 1272–1377. Routledge.
- Prestwich, Michael (2005). Plantagenet England, 1225–1360. Oxford University Press.
- Sumption, Jonathan (2001). The Hundred Years War. Vol. II: Trial by Fire. University of Pennsylvania Press.
- Tout, T. F. (1905). The Political History of England, Volume 3. Longmans, Green And Co.
- Tuchman, Barbara W. (1979). A Distant Mirror: The Calamitous 14th Century. Ballantine.
- Watts, John (2009). The Making of Polities: Europe, 1300–1500. Cambridge University Press.
