= Chris Given-Wilson =

British historian and academic (born 1949)

- Born: 1949 (age 76–77)

Academic work
- Discipline: History
- Sub-discipline: Medieval History
- Institutions: University of St Andrews
- Notable works: Edward II: The Terrors of Kingship (2016)

Chris Given-Wilson (born 1949) is a British historian and academic specialising in medieval history. He is an emeritus professor of history at the University of St Andrews. Given-Wilson has published widely on medieval English historical writing and has written on medieval authors such as William of Malmesbury and Adam of Usk.

== Bibliography ==
His notable books include:

- Henry IV
- Edward II: The Terrors of Kingship
- The Royal Bastards of Medieval England
- Chronicles: The Writing of History in Medieval England
- The English Nobility in the Late Middle Ages
- Chronicles of the Revolution, 1397-1400: The Reign of Richard II
- The Royal Household and the King's Affinity: Service, Politics, and Finance in England, 1360-1413
- The Parliament Rolls of Medieval England, 1275-1504: Rotuli Parliamentorum
