= Crécy campaign =

1346–1347 military campaign during the Hundred Years' War

Crécy campaign Chevauchée of Edward III in 1346
- Part of the Hundred Years' War
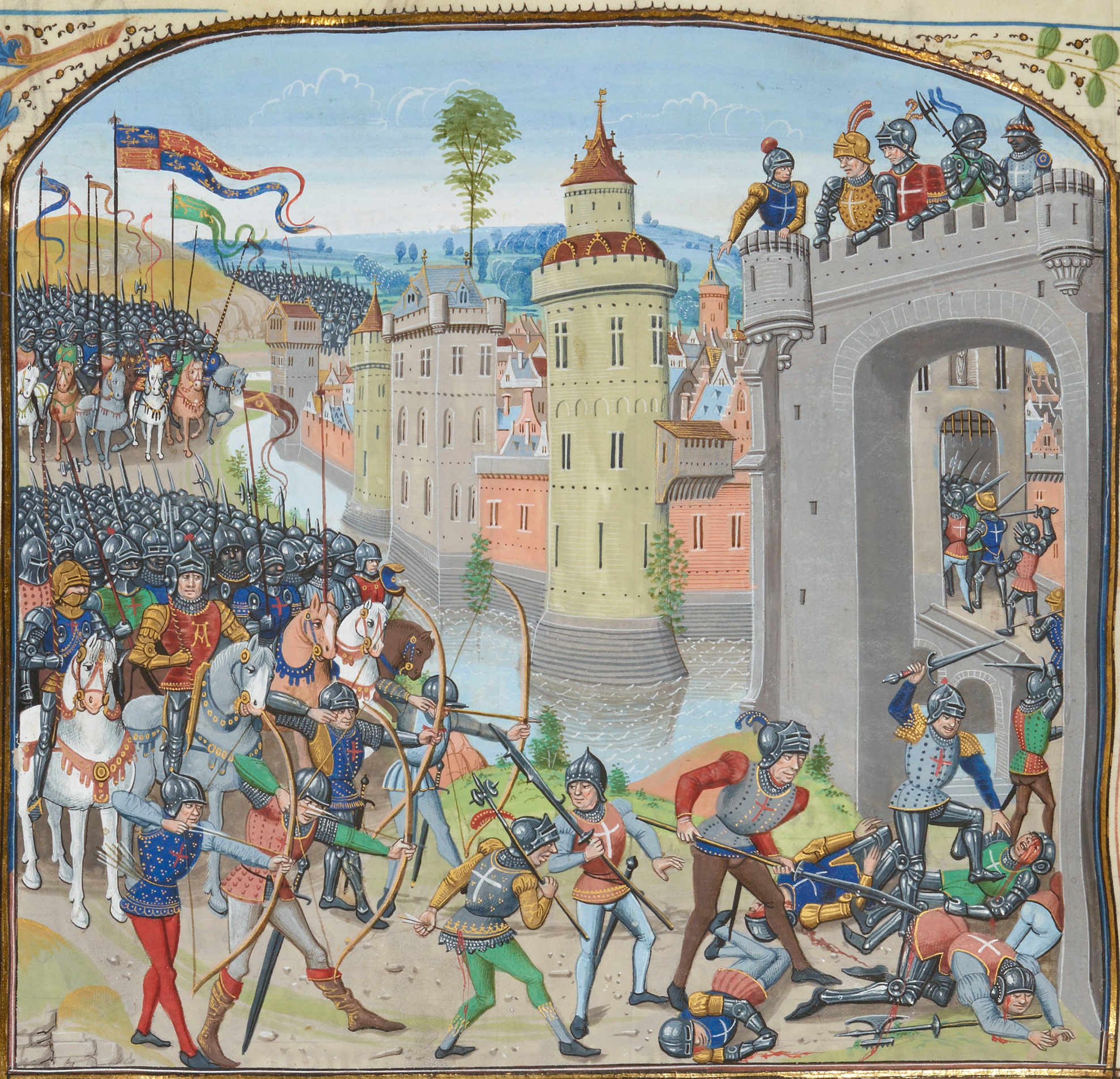
- The English assault on Caen, from Froissart's Chronicles
Date	26 July 1346 – 3 August 1347
Location	Northern France
Result	English victory

Belligerents
Kingdom of England	Kingdom of France

Commanders and leaders
King Edward III	King Philip VI (WIA)

Casualties and losses
Unknown, light	Unknown, heavy

The Crécy campaign was a series of large-scale raids (chevauchées) conducted by the Kingdom of England throughout northern France in 1346 that devastated the French countryside on a wide front, culminating in the Battle of Crécy. The campaign was part of the Hundred Years' War.

The campaign began on 12 July 1346, with the landing of English troops in Normandy, and ended with the capitulation of Calais on 3 August 1347. The English army was led by King Edward III, and the French by King Philip VI.

Edward was under pressure from the English Parliament to end the war either by negotiation or with a victory. As his forces gathered, Edward vacillated as to where in France he would land. Eventually he decided to sail for Gascony, to succour the Duke of Lancaster, who was facing the much larger main French army. Hampered by contrary winds, Edward instead made a surprise landing on the nearest part of France, the northern Cotentin Peninsula.

The English devastated much of Normandy, and stormed and sacked Caen, slaughtering the population. They then raided the suburbs of Rouen before cutting a swath along the left bank of the Seine to Poissy, 20 miles (32 km) from Paris. Turning north, the English became trapped in territory which the French had denuded of food. They escaped by fighting their way across a ford in the Somme river against a French blocking force. Two days later, on ground of their choosing, the English inflicted a heavy defeat on the French at the Battle of Crécy on 26 August 1346, before moving on to besiege Calais. After an eleven-month siege, which stretched both countries' financial and military resources to the limit, the town fell.

Shortly afterwards, the Truce of Calais was agreed; it ran for nine months to 7 July 1348, but was extended repeatedly over the years until it was formally set aside in 1355. Fighting continued during the truce, but not on the same scale as during the chevauchée period. Calais served as an English entrepôt into northern France that was held for over two hundred years.

== Background ==
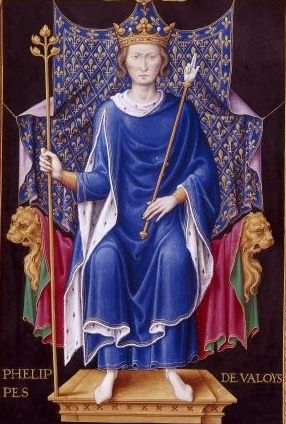
Philip VI of France

Since the Norman Conquest of 1066, English monarchs had held titles and lands within France, the possession of which made them vassals of the kings of France. The status of the English king's French fiefs was a major source of conflict between the two monarchies throughout the Middle Ages. French monarchs systematically sought to check the growth of English power, stripping away lands as the opportunity arose. Over the centuries, English holdings in France had varied in size, but by 1337 only Gascony in south-western France and Ponthieu in northern France were left. The Gascons preferred their relationship with a distant English king who left them alone to one with a French king who would interfere in their affairs. Following a series of disagreements between Philip VI of France (r. 1328–1350) and Edward III of England (r. 1327–1377), on 24 May 1337 Philip's Great Council in Paris agreed that Gascony and Ponthieu should be taken back into Philip's hands on the grounds that Edward was in breach of his obligations as a vassal. This marked the start of the Hundred Years' War, which was to last 116 years.

=== 1345 ===
Although Gascony was the cause of the war, Edward was able to spare few resources for it, and whenever an English army campaigned on the continent it operated in northern France. Edward determined early in 1345 to attack France on three fronts: a small force would sail for Brittany, under the command of William, Earl of Northampton; a slightly larger force would proceed to Gascony under the command of Henry, Earl of Derby; and the main force would accompany Edward to northern France or Flanders. In early 1345 the French decided to stand on the defensive in the south-west. Their intelligence had uncovered the English plan for offensives in the three theatres, but they did not have the money to raise a significant army in each. They anticipated, correctly, that the English planned to make their main effort in northern France. Thus they directed what resources they had to there, planning to assemble their main army at Arras on 22 July. South-western France was encouraged to rely on its own resources.

Edward III's main army sailed on 29 June. It anchored off Sluys in Flanders until 22 July, while Edward attended to diplomatic affairs. When the ships sailed, probably intending to land in Normandy, they were scattered by a storm and found their way to English ports over the following week. After more than five weeks on board ship, the men and horses had to be disembarked. There was a further week's delay while the King and his council debated what to do, by which time it proved impossible to take any action with the main English army before winter. Aware of this, Philip dispatched reinforcements to Brittany and Gascony. During 1345 Derby had led a whirlwind campaign through Gascony at the head of an Anglo-Gascon army. He decisively defeated two large French armies at the battles of Bergerac and Auberoche, captured French towns and fortifications in much of Périgord and most of Agenais and gave the English possessions in Gascony strategic depth. Late in the year he captured the strategically and logistically important town of Aiguillon, "the key to Gascony". In October the Earl of Northampton commenced a campaign in northern Brittany, but it fizzled out in a series of failures to capture French-held Breton towns, and Northampton and most of his force were recalled in the spring.

== Prelude ==
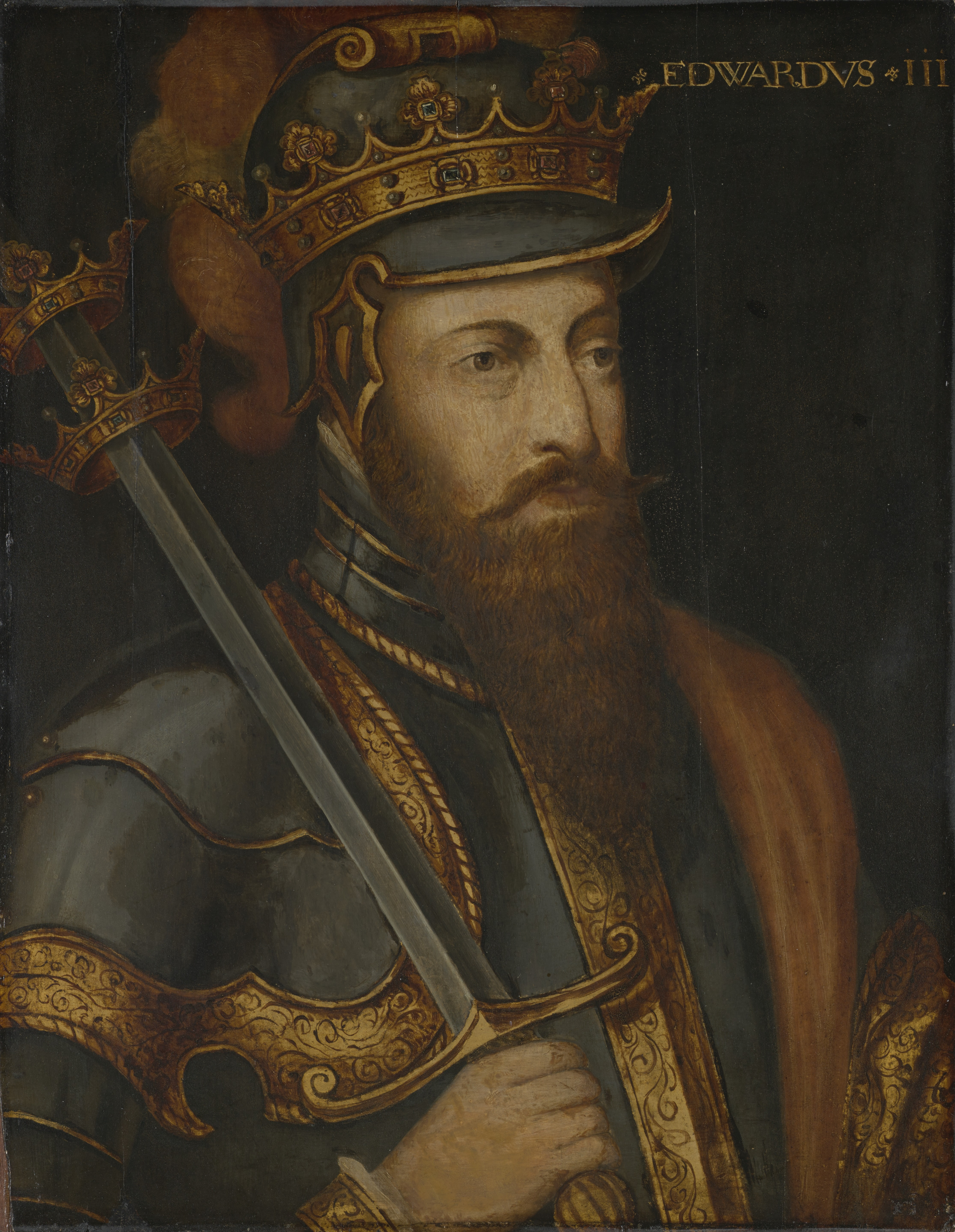
Edward III of England

=== French preparations ===
As always, money was short for the French in 1346. In spite of borrowing over 330,000 florins (£60 million in 2025 terms (Note: UK Consumer Price Index inflation figures from 1209–2024 based on data from "Inflation calculator". Bank of England. London. 18 February 2026.)) from the Pope, orders were issued to local officials to: "Amass all of the money you can for the support of our wars. Take it from each and every person you can ..." It was a clear indication of the desperate state of the French finances. Nevertheless, two armies were formed, at Orléans and Toulouse. Duke John of Normandy, the son and heir of Philip VI, was placed in charge of all French forces in south-west France, as he had been the previous autumn.

In March 1346 the French, numbering between 15,000 and 20,000 and including a large siege train and five cannon, enormously superior to any force the Anglo-Gascons could field, marched on Aiguillon and besieged it on 1 April. On 2 April the arrière-ban, the formal call to arms for all able-bodied males, was announced for the south of France. French financial, logistical and manpower efforts were focused on this offensive. Derby, now known as Lancaster after the death of his father, (Note: During the 1345 campaign he was known as the Earl of Derby, but his father died in September 1345 and he became the Earl of Lancaster) sent an urgent appeal for help to Edward. Edward was not only morally obliged to succour his vassal, but also contractually required to; his indenture with Lancaster stated that if Lancaster were attacked by overwhelming numbers, then Edward "shall rescue him in one way or another".

=== English preparations ===
In England, Parliament had voted a large war subsidy in 1344. Much of this had been spent, but some of the proceeds were still being collected. The ability to collect further revenue from English taxpayers was exhausted. As short of money as the French, the English exacted £15,000 in forced loans from church officials; commensurate amounts from English towns; and confiscated a year's income from all benefices held in England by foreigners. Huge orders for military equipment and victuals were placed, (Note: Between 1341 and 1346 over one million longbow arrows were ordered.) and much was compulsorily purchased. It had long been the case that all Englishmen of military age could be called to arms to defend the country against invaders; in early 1346 this was extended to a requirement to also serve overseas. The English were weary of the apparently pointless and fruitless war, and the previous Parliament, of June 1344, had demanded that Edward "make an end to this war, either by battle or by a suitable peace".

The English intended to gather an even larger army in 1346 than in 1345, over 20,000 men. This was supposed to gather around Portsmouth in February, but the date was postponed for two months, and then for another month. The Scots, incited by Philip, had been perceived as a threat by the English for some time; two years earlier the Chancellor of England had told Parliament the Scots were "saying quite openly that they will break the truce as soon as our adversary [France] desires and will march into England". Edward exempted the counties north of the River Humber from sending men to join the invasion force, and some limited financial commitments were made to them. It was also feared that with military resources committed to France, the South Coast of England would be exposed to French depredations, as it had been in 1338 and 1339. Extensive measures were taken to guard against this, including placing everyone dwelling within 15 miles (24 kilometres) of the sea under the control of local commanders. Both these measures reduced the force available to Edward, as did a degree of resistance to the new conscription regime. In an attempt to make up the numbers, the previous year's expedient of permitting convicted felons to enrol on the promise of a pardon if they served for the duration of the campaign was repeated, with up to a thousand being recruited. Edward mustered perhaps half of his hoped-for total by the end of June.

=== Naval preparations ===
Despite English efforts to conceal their preparations, the French were aware of them. Given the extreme difficulty of disembarking an army other than at a port, the English no longer having access to a port in Flanders, and the existence of friendly ports in Brittany and Gascony, they assumed that Edward would sail for one of the latter; probably Gascony, to relieve Aiguillon. To guard against the possibility of an English landing in northern France, Philip relied on his powerful navy. This consisted of requisitioned merchant ships and hired war galleys. The merchant ships were cogs, with a deep draught and a round hull, propelled by a single large sail set on a mast amidships. They were converted into warships by the addition of wooden "castles" at the bow and stern and the erection of crow's nest fighting platforms at the masthead. At least 78 were taken into royal service and fitted out as warships in Lower Normandy, and more in Picardy and Upper Normandy. Galleys were oar-propelled and highly manoeuvrable, making them effective for raiding and ship-to-ship combat, but relatively expensive and difficult to move long distances. The French had hired a fleet of at least 32 from Genoa, and it was contracted to arrive in Boulogne by 20 May. In the event, by early July it had not got further than the Tagus roadstead, off Portugal. It has been suggested that the extremely slow progress of the Genoese may have been the result of English bribery.

Edward requisitioned the largest fleet assembled by the English to that date, 747 ships. It was scheduled to assemble by 1 March; this was first postponed to 1 May and then 15 May. By English common law, the king was required to compensate the owners of ships impressed into service, but in practice he paid little and late, which caused shipowners to be reluctant to answer summonses to arms. Edward himself arrived at Porchester on 1 June. He had originally planned to land in Brittany, but was frustrated by Northampton's failure to capture a port. He then focused on Gascony, and decided to reinforce Lancaster and confront Duke John of Normandy outside Aiguillon. The fleet took on sufficient supplies for the journey to Bordeaux and sailed from Portsmouth on 28 June. Not all the ships had reached the assembly point and Edward paused off Yarmouth for latecomers to arrive. By the time they had, the wind was foul and the fleet sat off the north-east corner of the Isle of Wight for two weeks. This was the normal duration of the whole journey, and ships ran short of food and water. After the debacle of the previous year, Edward decided not to risk disembarking his army with the intention of resupplying and setting off for Bordeaux once more. He was aware that with the French focused on Aiguillon, northern France would be effectively defenceless. So, on 11 July, with the wind still preventing movement down the English Channel, he changed his plans and sailed due south and made landfall at St. Vaast la Hogue, 20 miles (32 km) from Cherbourg, on 12 July. The Genoese galley fleet was still well to the south of the major French port of La Rochelle, on the Bay of Biscay. The French cogs converted to warships or in the process of being converted had not yet assembled.

== Campaign in France ==
=== Devastating the Cotentin ===
The route of the English army

The English army was estimated to be between 7,000 and 10,000 strong and consisted of both English and Welsh soldiers combined with specialists and officials. It is considered to have been unusually well equipped for a medieval army and included miners, blacksmiths and Welsh to English interpreters. It included several Norman barons who were unhappy with French rule, including Geoffroy de Harcourt, Viscount of Saint-Sauveur. The region where they landed, the Cotentin Peninsula, was virtually undefended and the English were able to disembark on the long sandy beaches. They spent six days unloading, organising themselves, plundering the countryside and baking bread. This pause was mostly to refresh the horses, who would have needed at least this long to recover from being cooped up on board ship for two weeks. The army included a sizeable supply train carrying ammunition, stores, gunpowder weapons and food; the latter could be replaced from local sources to maintain a reserve for when the army needed to concentrate and was unable to forage. Over 50 men were dubbed knights, including Edward's eldest son, in an act of ceremonial preparation for the campaign.

The local French commander, Robert Bertrand, led 300 militia in an ineffective attack against the landing. Until a few days before the landing he had also had 500 professional mercenaries under his command, but they had deserted several days earlier because their pay was in arrears. The English achieved complete strategic surprise and marched south, organised in three divisions, or "battles". Edward's aim was to conduct a chevauchée, a large-scale raid, across French territory to reduce his opponent's morale and wealth. Several historians have argued that Edward wished to bring the French to battle, and that his chevauchée was intended to provoke Philip into accepting one.

While wishing to seize the movable wealth of the areas he crossed, Edward issued strict instructions that no ecclesiastical properties were to be looted, no civilians were to be harmed, and no buildings were to be burnt; he set up a clear enforcement mechanism. However, the English army and the ships' crews were out of his and his nobles' control from the moment they landed. Before the army had even set off from St. Vaast la Hogue the Abbey of Notre-Dame-du-Vœu near Cherbourg, a foundation of Matilda, daughter of Henry I of England, was burnt down by Englishmen for the third time in 50 years; la Hogue itself was also burnt down. Once on the march, English soldiers set fire to every town in their path, looted whatever they could from the populace and from private and ecclesiastical establishments and frequently raped the women. The towns of Cherbourg, Carentan, Saint-Lô and Torteval were burnt as the army passed, along with many smaller places. The populations of some towns were systematically massacred, in others the bloodshed was more casual. Most French non-combatants in the path of the English fled south, and towns throughout Normandy became clogged with penurious refugees. The English fleet paralleled the army's route, devastating the country for up to 5 miles (8 km) inland and taking vast amounts of loot; many ships deserted, their crews having filled their holds. They also captured or burnt over 100 ships; 61 of these had been converted into military vessels. The destruction of these ships much diminished, at least temporarily, French raids against English coastal areas and attacks on English merchant shipping.

Bertrand broke the bridges in front of the English army in an attempt to delay it, but they were rapidly repaired by the team of 40 carpenters accompanying the English army. The resistance to the English was weaker than it might have been as a large proportion of the fighting men of Normandy were with Duke John in front of Aiguillon. Raoul, Count of Eu, who was the Grand Constable of France, the senior position in the French military hierarchy, had been hastily transferred north from Aiguillon. He decided to resist the English at Caen, the cultural, political, religious and financial centre of north-west Normandy, larger than any town in England except London. Every available man was dispatched there, and large stocks of food were shipped in.

When the English arrived on the morning of 26 July it was defended by 1,500 soldiers, strongly reinforced by the city's militia. The English immediately stormed and captured the city, subsequently looting it for five days. Some 5,000 French soldiers and civilians were killed as the English rampaged through the town. A small number escaped, fleeing for the nearby woods, pursued by cavalry. English losses were light. Among the handful of prisoners taken was Raoul of Eu. The English discovered a proclamation from Philip instructing Norman raiding parties to despoil the south coast of England, which the Archbishop of Canterbury publicised as evidence that Edward was protecting the Realm; it was also used by English recruiting parties for several years to stir up anti-French feeling.

On 29 July Edward sent his fleet back to England, with a letter ordering that reinforcements, supplies and money be collected, embarked and loaded respectively, and sent to rendezvous with his army at Crotoy, on the north bank of the mouth of the River Somme. Money in particular was short, some units had not received their April wages, none had received their wages for the June quarter. Edward's direction of travel was clear, some modern historians argue that his eventual target was already Calais. The English marched out towards the Seine on 1 August. Garrisons were left in several places, including Caen and Carenten, but they were rapidly overcome by the French once the main English force had moved on.

=== March on Paris ===
The French military position was difficult. Their main army was committed to the intractable siege of Aiguillon. After his surprise landing in Normandy Edward was devastating some of the richest land in France and flaunting his ability to march at will. On 2 August a small English force commanded by Hugh Hastings and supported by many Flemings invaded France from Flanders; French defences here were completely inadequate. The treasury was all but empty. Philip immediately recalled his main army, under Duke John, from Gascony. After a furious argument with his advisers, and according to some accounts his father's messenger, Duke John refused to move until Aiguillon fell and his honour was satisfied; the main French army remained tied down in the south west.

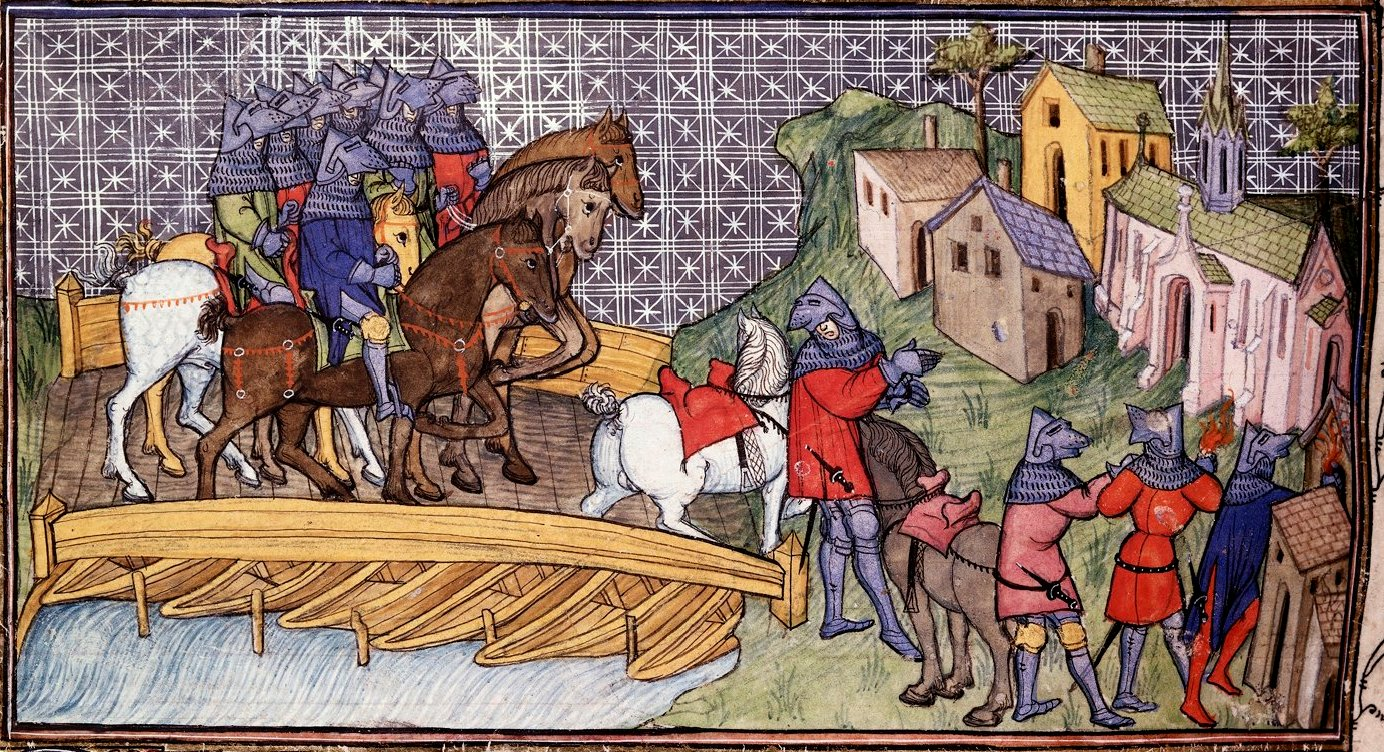
The English army crossing the Seine, as depicted in the 14th century

On 29 July Philip proclaimed the arrière-ban for northern France, ordering every able-bodied male to assemble at Rouen, where Philip arrived on the 31st. He immediately moved west against Edward with an ill-organised and ill-equipped army. Five days later he returned to Rouen and broke the bridge over the Seine behind him. On 7 August the English reached the Seine, 12 miles (20 km) south of Rouen, and raided up to its suburbs. Philip, under pressure from two cardinals sent by Pope Clement, sent envoys offering peace backed by a marriage alliance; Edward replied that he was not prepared to lose marching time to futile discussion and dismissed them. By 12 August, Edward's army was encamped at Poissy, 20 miles from Paris, having left a 40-mile-wide (64 km) swath of destruction down the left bank of the Seine, burning villages to within 2 miles (3 km) of Paris. The population was in uproar, swollen with refugees, and making preparations to defend the capital street by street. The English carpenters threw a bridge across the Seine after a detachment secured the far bank against strong opposition.

Philip again sent orders to Duke John of Normandy insisting that he abandon the siege of Aiguillon and march his army north. On 14 August Duke John requested a formal suspension of the siege. Lancaster, well aware of the situation in the north and in the French camps around Aiguillon, refused. On 20 August, after over five months, the French abandoned the siege and marched away in considerable haste and disorder. There was confusion in Philip's council as to why he did not lead out the French army to attempt to repel the invaders. Instead Philip sent a challenge on 14 August suggesting that the two armies do battle at a mutually agreed time and place in the area. Edward indicated that he would meet Philip to the south of the Seine, without actually committing himself. On 16 August the French moved into position; Edward promptly burnt down Poissy, destroyed the bridge there, and marched north.

=== March north ===
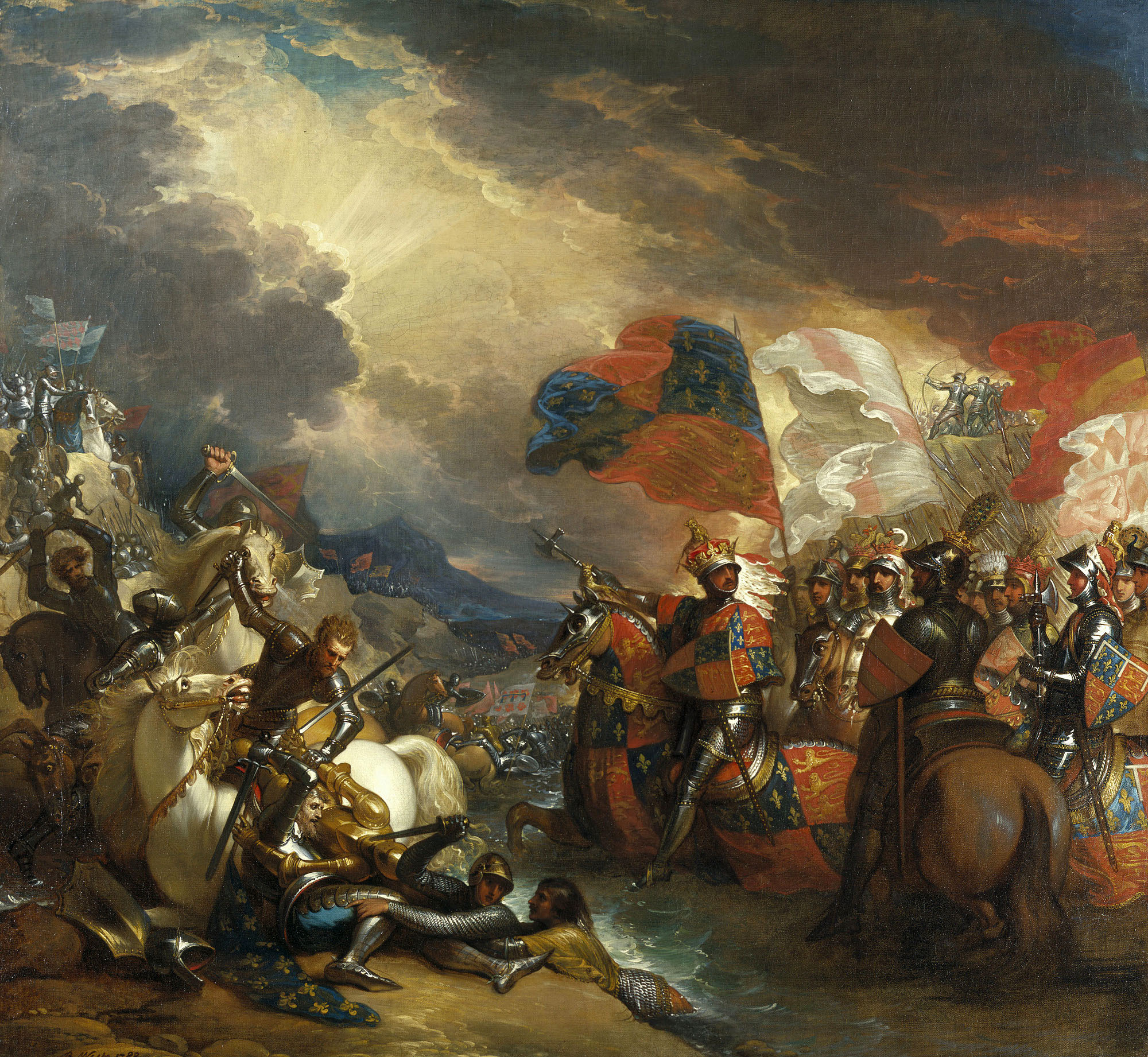
Edward III Crossing the Somme, painting by Benjamin West (1788)

In anticipation of such a move, the French had carried away all stores of food from the region the English were advancing into, forcing them to spread out over a wide area to forage, which greatly slowed them. Bands of French peasants attacked some of the smaller groups of foragers. Philip reached the River Somme a day's march ahead of Edward. He based himself at Amiens and sent large detachments to hold every bridge and ford across the Seine between Amiens and the sea. The English were now trapped in an area which had been stripped of food. The French moved out of Amiens and advanced westwards towards the English. They were now willing to give battle, knowing that they would have the advantage of being able to stand on the defensive while the English were forced to try and fight their way past them.

Edward needed to break the French blockade of the Somme and probed at several points, vainly attacking Hangest and Pont-Remy before moving west along the river. On the evening of 24 August the English were encamped north of Acheux while the French were 6 miles (10 km) away at Abbeville. During the night the English marched on a tidal ford named Blanchetaque. The far bank was defended by a force of 3,500 French. English longbowmen and mounted men-at-arms waded into the tidal river and after a short, sharp fight routed the French. The main French army had followed the English, and their scouts captured some stragglers and several wagons, but Edward had broken free of immediate pursuit. The French had been so confident that the English could not breach the Somme line that they had not denuded the area, and the countryside was rich in food and loot. So the English were able to resupply, Noyelles-sur-Mer and Crotoy in particular yielding large stores of food, which were looted and the towns then burnt.

Meanwhile, the Flemings, having been prevented from crossing the bridge at Estaires by the French, besieged Béthune on 14 August. After several setbacks they fell out among themselves, burnt their siege equipment and gave up their expedition on 24 August. Edward received the news that he would not be reinforced by the Flemings shortly after crossing the Somme. Nor was his fleet waiting with reinforcements at the mouth of the Somme. He decided to engage Philip's army with the force he had. Having temporarily shaken off the French pursuit, he used the respite to prepare a defensive position at Crécy-en-Ponthieu. The French returned to Abbeville and doggedly set off after the English again.

=== Battle of Crécy ===
Map of the Battle of Crécy

Having decided to offer battle to Philip, Edward chose a defensive position between Crécy and Wadicourt, which each protected one of his flanks, with care. While waiting for the French to catch up with them the English fortified their baggage camp, dug pits in front of their positions and set up several primitive gunpowder weapons. Around noon on 26 August the French van came in sight of the English. At a council of war the senior French officials, who were completely confident of victory, advised an attack, but not until the next day. In the event the French attacked later the same afternoon; it is unclear from the contemporary sources whether this was a deliberate choice by Philip, or because too many of the large number of French knights kept pressing forward and the battle commenced against Philip's wishes.

The French numbers are inconsistently reported, but it is clear that their army was very large for the period, and several times larger than the English force. The French unfurled their sacred battle banner, the oriflamme, indicating that no prisoners would be taken. A large force of Italian crossbowmen went forward to engage the English longbowmen in an archery duel. The longbowmen outranged their opponents and had a rate of fire more than three times greater. The crossbowmen were also without their protective pavises, which were still with the French baggage. The Italians were rapidly defeated and fled.

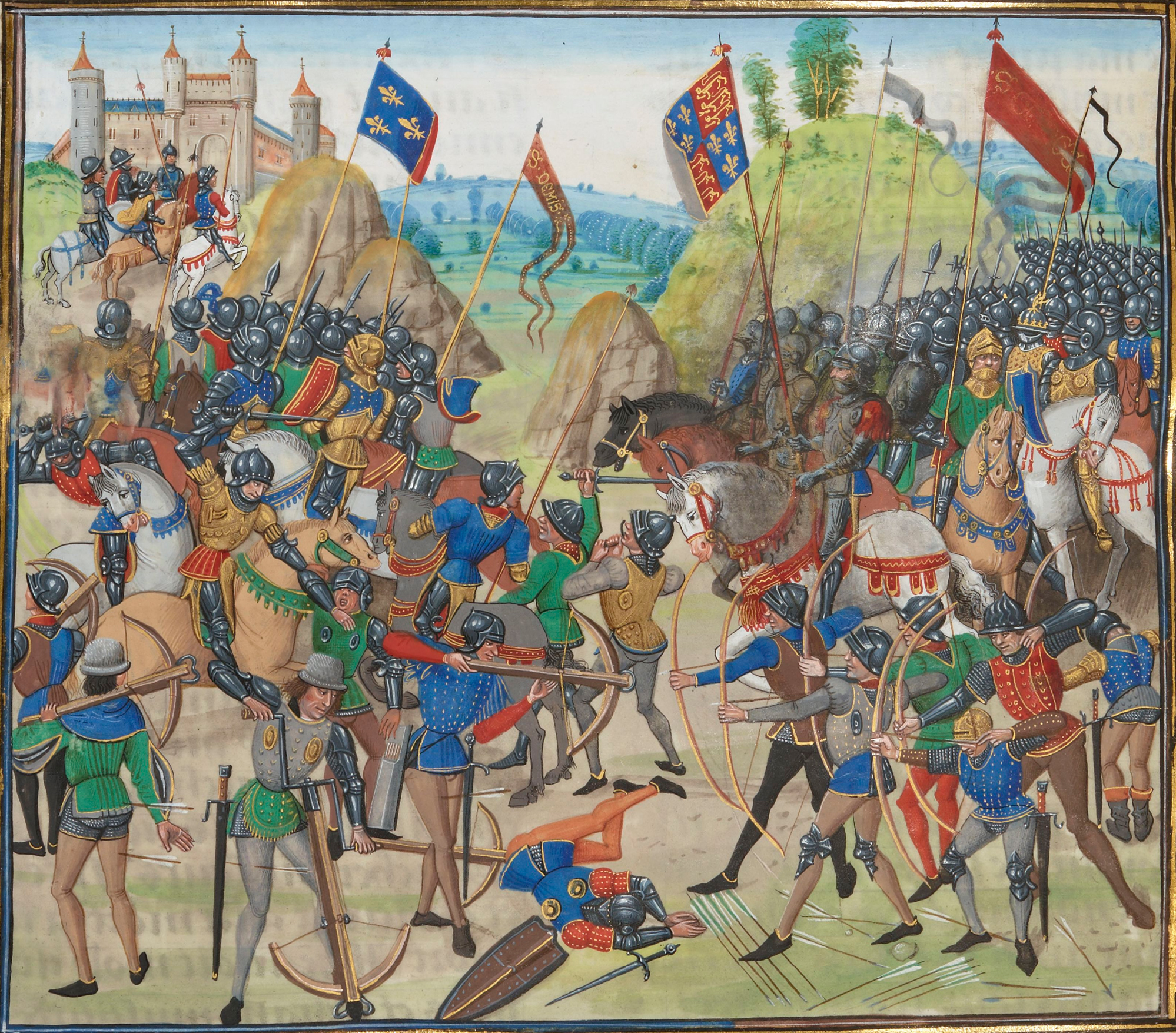
The Battle of Crécy, from Froissart's Chronicles

The French then launched cavalry charges by their mounted knights at the English men-at-arms, who had dismounted for the battle. These charges were disordered due to their impromptu nature, by having to force their way through the fleeing Italians, by the muddy ground, by having to charge uphill, and by the pits dug by the English. The attacks were further broken up by the heavy and effective fire from the English archers, which caused heavy casualties. By the time the French charges reached the English infantry they had lost much of their impetus. A contemporary described the hand-to-hand combat which ensued as "murderous, without pity, cruel, and very horrible". The French charges continued into the night, all with the same result: fierce fighting followed by a French repulse. Philip himself was caught up in the fighting, had two horses killed from underneath him, and received an arrow in the jaw. The oriflamme was captured after its bearer was killed. The French broke and fled; the English, exhausted, slept where they had fought.

The next morning substantial French forces were still arriving on the battlefield, to be charged by the English men-at-arms, now mounted, routed and pursued for miles. The French losses were very heavy and were recorded at the time as 1,200 knights killed and over 15,000 others. The highest contemporary estimate of English fatalities was 300.

The scale of the English victory is described by the modern historian Andrew Ayton as "unprecedented" and "a devastating military humiliation". Jonathan Sumption considers it "a political catastrophe for the French Crown". The battle was reported to the English Parliament on 13 September in glowing terms as a sign of divine favour and as a justification for the huge cost of the war to date.

=== Siege of Calais ===
After resting for two days and burying the dead, the English, requiring supplies and reinforcements, marched north. They continued to devastate the land, and set several towns on fire, including Wissant, the normal port of disembarkation for English shipping to north-west France. Outside the burning town Edward held a council, which decided to capture Calais; an ideal entrepôt from an English point of view, being already strongly defended, possessing a secure harbour and established port facilities, and being in the part of France closest to the ports of south-east England. It was also close to the border of Flanders and Edward's Flemish allies. The English arrived outside the town on 4 September and besieged it.

Calais was strongly fortified; being surrounded by extensive marshes, some of them tidal, which made it difficult to find stable platforms for trebuchets and other artillery capable of breaching its walls. Calais was adequately garrisoned and provisioned, and could be reinforced and supplied by sea. The day after the siege commenced, the English ships expected at Crotoy arrived off-shore and resupplied, re-equipped and reinforced the English army. The English settled down for a lengthy stay, establishing a thriving camp to the west, Nouville, or "New Town", with two market days each week. A major victualling operation drew on sources throughout England and Wales to supply the besiegers, as well as overland from nearby Flanders. Parliament grudgingly agreed to fund the siege. Edward declared it a matter of honour and avowed his intent to remain until the town fell. The two cardinals representing the Pope travelled between the armies, but neither king would speak to them.

==== French disorder ====
Philip vacillated: on the day the siege of Calais began he disbanded most of his army, to save money and convinced that Edward had finished his chevauchée and would proceed to Flanders and ship his army home. On or shortly after 7 September, Duke John made contact with Philip, having shortly before disbanded his own army. On 9 September Philip announced that the army would reassemble at Compiègne on 1 October, an impossibly short interval, and then march to the relief of Calais. Among other consequences, this equivocation allowed Lancaster in the south-west to launch offensives into Quercy and the Bazadais; and himself lead a chevauchée 160 miles (260 km) north through Saintonge, Aunis and Poitou, capturing numerous towns, castles and smaller fortified places and storming the rich city of Poitiers. These offensives completely disrupted the French defences and shifted the focus of the fighting from the heart of Gascony to 60 miles (97 km) or more beyond its borders. Few French troops had arrived at Compiègne by 1 October and as Philip and his court waited for the numbers to swell, news of Lancaster's conquests came in. Believing that Lancaster was heading for Paris, the French changed the assembly point for any men not already committed to Compiègne to Orléans, and reinforced them with some of those already mustered, to block this. After Lancaster turned south to head back to Gascony, those Frenchmen already at or heading towards Orléans were redirected to Compiègne; French planning collapsed into chaos.

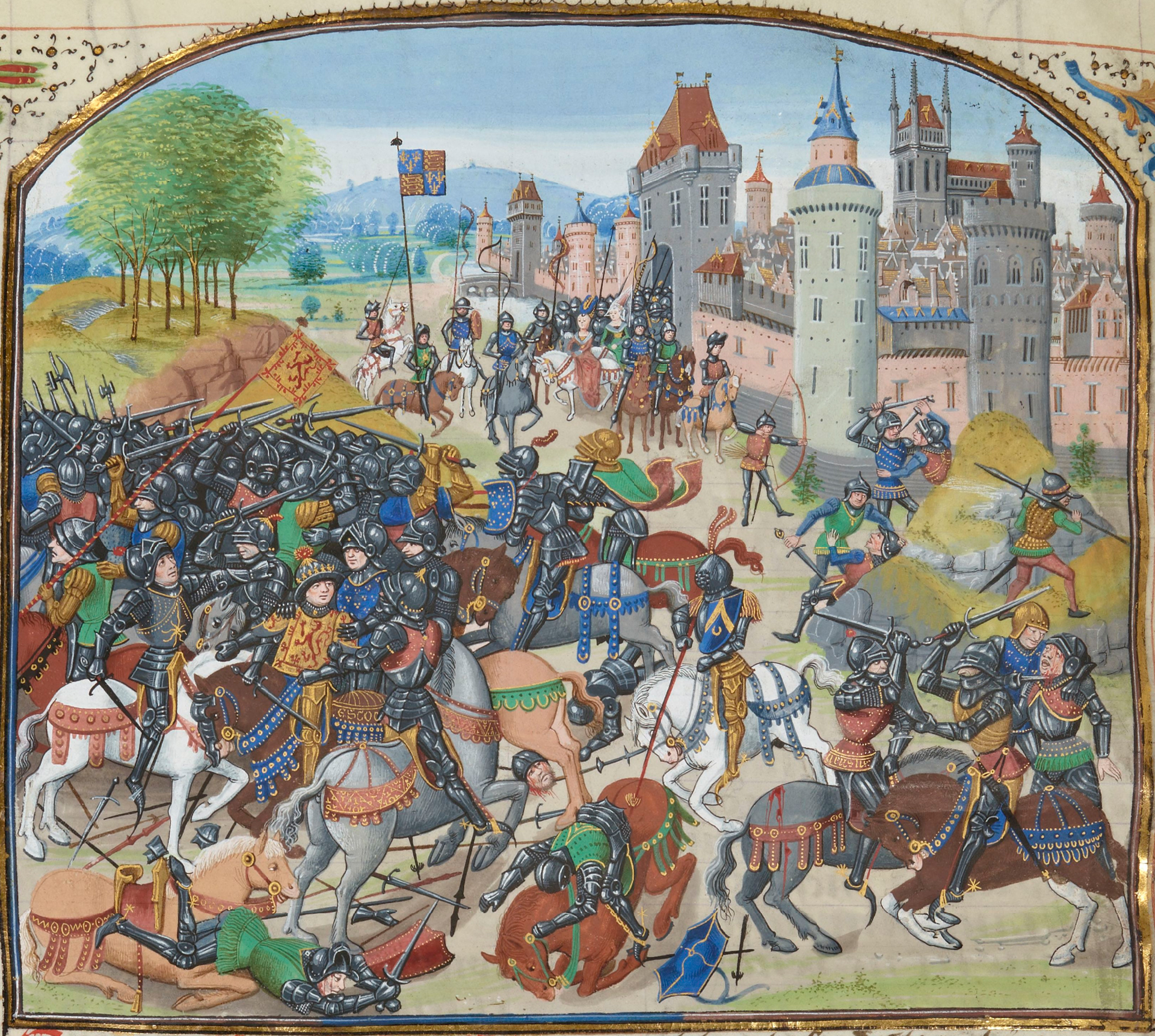
Battle of Neville's Cross from a 15th-century manuscript

Philip had been calling on the Scots to fulfil their obligation under the terms of the Auld Alliance and invade England since June. The Scottish king, David II, convinced that English force was focused entirely on France, obliged on 7 October. He was brought to battle at Neville's Cross on 17 October by a smaller English force raised exclusively from the northern English counties. The battle ended with the rout of the Scots, the capture of their king and the death or capture of most of their leadership. Strategically this freed significant English resources for the war against France, and the English border counties were able to guard against the remaining Scottish threat from their own resources.

Even though only 3,000 men-at-arms had assembled at Compiègne, the French treasurer was unable to pay them. Philip cancelled all offensive arrangements on 27 October and dispersed his army. Recriminations were rife: officials at all levels of the Chambre des Comptes (the French treasury) were dismissed and all financial affairs were put into the hands of a committee of three senior abbots. The King's council bent their efforts to blaming each other for the kingdom's misfortunes. Philip's heir, Duke John, fell out with his father and refused to attend court for several months. Joan II, Queen of Navarre, daughter of a previous king of France (Louis X), and previously a partisan of Philip, declared neutrality and signed a private truce with Lancaster.

==== Military operations ====
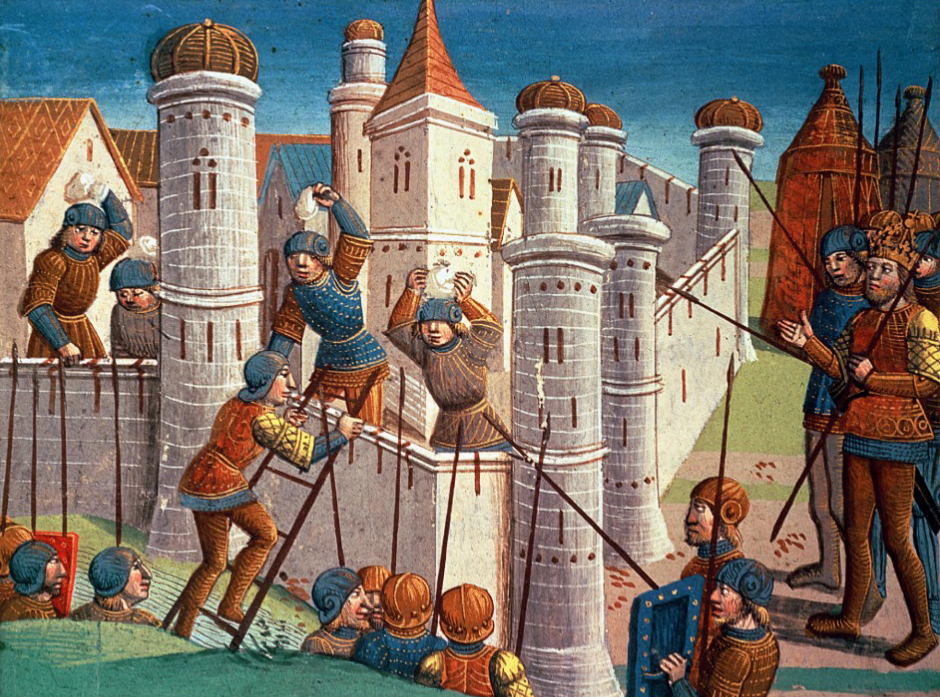
A medieval town under siege

Between mid-November and late February Edward made several attempts to breach the walls with trebuchets or cannon, and to take the town by assault, either from the land or seaward side; all were unsuccessful. During the winter the French made great efforts to strengthen their naval resources. This included French and mercenary Italian galleys and French merchant ships, many adapted for military use. During March and April, over 1,000 long tons (1,000 t) of supplies were run into Calais without opposition. Philip attempted to take the field in late April, but the French ability to assemble their army in a timely fashion had not improved since the autumn and by July it had still not fully mustered. Taxes proved ever more difficult to collect. Several French nobles sounded out the idea of switching their allegiance to Edward. Inconclusive fighting occurred in April and May: the French tried and failed to cut the English supply route to Flanders, the English tried and failed to capture Saint-Omer and Lille. In June the French attempted to secure their flank by launching a major offensive against the Flemings; this was defeated at Cassel.

In late April the English established a fortification on the end of the spit of sand to the north of Calais, which enabled them to command the entrance to the harbour. In May, June and July the French attempted to force convoys through, unsuccessfully. On 25 June the commander of the Calais garrison wrote to Philip saying their food was exhausted and suggesting that they may have to resort to cannibalism. Despite increasing financial difficulties, the English steadily reinforced their army through 1347, reaching a peak strength of 32,000. (Note: The largest English army to travel overseas before 1600.) Over 20,000 Flemings were gathered less than a day's march from Calais. 24,000 sailors, in a total of 853 ships supported this force. (Note: This is separate from the 747 vessels involved in shipping the army to Normandy in July 1346.) On 17 July Philip led the French army north. Alerted to this, Edward called the Flemings to Calais. On 27 July the French came within view of the town, 6 miles (10 km) away. Their army was between 15,000 and 20,000 strong; a third of the size of the English, who had prepared earthworks and palisades across every approach. The English position clearly being unassailable, Philip finally admitted the Pope's cardinals to an audience. They in turn arranged talks, but after four days of wrangling these came to nothing. On 1 August the garrison of Calais, having observed the French army seemingly within reach for a week, signalled that they were on the verge of surrender. That night the French army withdrew.

On 3 August 1347 Calais surrendered. The entire French population was expelled. A vast amount of booty was found within the town. Edward repopulated the town with English, and a few Flemings. Calais was vital to England's effort against the French for the rest of the war, it being widely considered all but impossible to land a significant force other than at a friendly port. It also allowed the accumulation of supplies and materiel before a campaign. A ring of substantial fortifications defending the approaches to Calais were rapidly constructed, marking the boundary of an area known as the Pale of Calais. The town had an extremely large standing garrison of 1,400 men, virtually a small army, under the overall command of the Captain of Calais. Edward granted Calais numerous trade concessions and privileges and it became the main port of entry for English exports to the continent, a position which it still holds. The period of the chevauchée, from the landing in Normandy to the fall of Calais, became known as Edward III's annus mirabilis (year of marvels).

== Aftermath ==
As soon as Calais capitulated, Edward paid off a large part of his army and released his Flemish allies. Several thousand pardons were issued to felons on completion of their military service. Philip in turn stood down the French army. Edward promptly launched strong raids up to 30 miles (48 km) into French territory. Philip attempted to recall his army, setting a date of 1 September, but experienced serious difficulties. His treasury was exhausted and taxes for the war had to be collected in many places at sword point. Despite these exigencies, ready cash was not forthcoming. The French army had little stomach for further conflict, and Philip was reduced to threatening to confiscate the estates of nobles who refused to muster. He set back the date for his army to assemble by a month. Edward also had difficulties in raising money, partly due to the unexpected timing of the need; he employed draconian measures, which were extremely unpopular. The English also suffered two military setbacks: a large raid was routed by the French garrison of Saint-Omer; and a supply convoy en route to Calais was captured by French raiders from Boulogne. The cardinals acting as papal emissaries found willing listeners in September and by the 28th a truce, known as the Truce of Calais, had been agreed.

The truce is considered to have most favoured the English. For its duration the English were confirmed in possession of their extensive territorial conquests in France and Scotland; the Flemish were confirmed in their de facto independence; and Philip was prevented from punishing those French nobles who had conspired, or even fought, against him. So highly regarded was Edward across Europe in the light of his chevauchée that he was offered the crown of the Holy Roman Empire by a group of the electors; Edward declined.

It ran for nine months to 7 July 1348, but was extended repeatedly over the years until it was formally set aside in 1355. The truce did not stop the ongoing naval clashes between the two countries nor the fighting in Gascony and Brittany. After full-scale war resumed in 1355 it continued until 1360, when it ended with the Treaty of Brétigny. Modern historian Clifford Rogers describes this as when:

the English strategy faithfully pursued since the Crécy campaign bore full fruit and Edward gained territories comprising a full third of France, to be held in full sovereignty, along with a huge ransom for the captive King John (Note: Duke John, who became king on the death of Philip VI in 1350 and was captured in 1356 at the Battle of Poitiers.Sumption 1999, p. 245) – his original war aims and much more.

Calais was finally lost by the English monarch Mary I, following the 1558 siege of Calais. The fall of Calais marked the loss of England's last possession in mainland France.

== Notes, citations and sources ==
=== References ===
- Allmand, Christopher (1989). The Hundred Years' War: England and France at War, c.1300-c.1450. Cambridge Medieval Textbooks. Cambridge: Cambridge University Press. ISBN 978-0521319232.
- Ayton, Andrew (2007) [2005]. "The Battle of Crécy: Context and Significance". In Ayton, Andrew & Preston, Philip (eds.). The Battle of Crécy, 1346. Woodbridge, Suffolk: Boydell Press. pp. 1–34. ISBN 978-1843831150.
- Ayton, Andrew (2007b) [2005]. "The Crécy Campaign". In Ayton, Andrew & Preston, Philip (eds.). The Battle of Crécy, 1346. Woodbridge, Suffolk: Boydell Press. pp. 35–108. ISBN 978-1843831150.
- Ayton, Andrew (2007c) [2005]. "The English Army at Crécy". In Ayton, Andrew & Preston, Philip (eds.). The Battle of Crécy, 1346. Woodbridge, Suffolk: Boydell Press. pp. 159–251. ISBN 978-1843831150.
- Bennett, Matthew (1999). "The Development of Battle Tactics in the Hundred Years War". In Curry, Anne; Hughes, Michael (eds.). Arms, Armies and Fortifications in the Hundred Years War. Woodbridge, Suffolk: Boydell & Brewer Ltd. pp. 69–82. ISBN 978-0851157559. Archived from the original on 6 May 2019.
- Burne, Alfred (1999) [1955]. The Crécy War. Ware, Hertfordshire: Wordsworth Editions. ISBN 978-1840222104.
- Corfis, Ivy; Wolfe, Michael (1999). The Medieval City Under Siege. Woodbridge, Suffolk; Rochester, NY: Boydell Press. ISBN 978-0851157566.
- Crowcroft, Robert; Cannon, John (2015). "Gascony". The Oxford Companion to British History. Oxford: Oxford University Press. p. 389. ISBN 978-0199677832.
- Curry, Anne (2002). The Hundred Years' War 1337–1453. Essential Histories. Oxford: Osprey Publishing. ISBN 978-1841762692.
- DeVries, Kelly (1998) [1996]. Infantry Warfare in the Early Fourteenth Century: Discipline, Tactics, and Technology. Woodbridge, Suffolk; Rochester, New York: Boydell Press. ISBN 978-0851155715.
- Fowler, Kenneth (1961). Henry of Grosmont, First Duke of Lancaster, 1310–1361 (PDF) (PhD thesis). Leeds: University of Leeds. Archived from the original (PDF) on 11 October 2018.
- Fowler, Kenneth Alan (1969). The King's Lieutenant: Henry of Grosmont, First Duke of Lancaster, 1310–1361. New York: Barnes & Noble. OCLC 164491035.
- Gribit, Nicholas (2016). Henry of Lancaster's Expedition to Aquitaine 1345–46. Woodbridge, Suffolk: Boydell Press. ISBN 978-1783271177.
- Gribit, Nicholas (2016b). "Siege and Conquest by Sword: The Second Campaign, 1346". Henry of Lancaster's Expedition to Aquitaine 1345–46. Cambridge University Press. Archived from the original on 3 April 2019.
- Harari, Yuval Noah (1999). "Inter-frontal Cooperation in the Fourteenth Century and Edward III's 1346 Campaign". War in History. 6 (4 (November 1999)): 379–395. JSTOR 26013966.
- Hardy, Robert (2010). Longbow: a Social and Military History (PDF). Yeovil, Somerset: Haynes Publishing. ISBN 978-185260-620-6. Archived (PDF) from the original on 6 December 2018.
- Harris, Robin (1994). Valois Guyenne. Royal Historical Society Studies in History. Vol. 71. London: Boydell Press. ISBN 978-0861932269.
- Hyland, Ann (1994). The Medieval Warhorse: from Byzantium to the Crusades. Dover: Alan Sutton Publishing. ISBN 978-0862999834.
- Jaques, Tony (2007). Dictionary of Battles and Sieges. Westport, Conn.: Greenwood Publishing Group. ISBN 978-0313335372.
- Lacey, Robert (2008). Great Tales from English History. London: Folio Society. OCLC 261939337.
- Lambert, Craig (2011). "Edward III's Siege of Calais: A Reappraisal". Journal of Medieval History. 37 (3): 245–256. doi:10.1016/j.jmedhist.2011.05.002. ISSN 0304-4181.
- Livingstone, Marilyn; Witzel, Morgen (2005). The Road to Crécy: The English Invasion of France, 1346. Harlow: Pearson Education. ISBN 978-0582784208.
- Lucas, Henry S. (1929). The Low Countries and the Hundred Years' War: 1326–1347. Ann Arbor: University of Michigan Press. OCLC 960872598.
- Neillands, Robin (2001). The Hundred Years War (Revised ed.). London; New York: Routledge. ISBN 978-0415261319. Archived from the original on 3 August 2020.
- Nicholson, Ranald (1974). Scotland: The Later Middle Ages. University of Edinburgh History of Scotland. Edinburgh: Oliver and Boyd. ISBN 978-0050020388.
- Oman, Charles (1998) [1924]. A History of the Art of War in the Middle Ages: 1278–1485 A.D. London: Greenhill Books. ISBN 978-1853673320.
- Ormrod, W. Mark (1990). Edward III. New Haven: Yale University Press. ISBN 978-0300055061.
- Penman, Michael (2004). David II. East Linton, East Lothian: Tuckwell Press. ISBN 978-1862322028.
- Piel, Christophe (2007) [2005]. "The Nobility of Normandy and the English Campaign of 1346". In Ayton, Andrew & Preston, Philip (eds.). The Battle of Crécy, 1346. Woodbridge, Suffolk: Boydell Press. pp. 253–264. ISBN 978-1843831150.
- Prestwich, M. (2003). The Three Edwards: War and State in England, 1272–1377 (2nd ed.). London: Routledge. ISBN 978-0415303095.
- Prestwich, M. (13 September 2007). J.M. Roberts (ed.). Plantagenet England 1225–1360. Oxford: Oxford University Press. ISBN 978-0199226870.
- Rodger, N.A.M. (2004). The Safeguard of the Sea. London: Penguin. ISBN 978-0140297249.
- Rogers, Clifford J (1994). "Edward III and the Dialectics of Strategy, 1327-1360". Transactions of the Royal Historical Society, Vol. 4. Transactions of the Royal Historical Society. Vol. 4. Cambridge: Cambridge University Press on behalf of the Royal Historical Society. pp. 83–102. doi:10.2307/3679216. JSTOR 3679216. OCLC 931311378.
- Rogers, Clifford J. (1998). "The Efficacy of the Medieval Longbow: A Reply to Kelly DeVries" (PDF). War in History. 5 (2): 233–42. doi:10.1177/096834459800500205. Archived from the original (PDF) on 3 February 2019.
- Rogers, Clifford J. (2000). War Cruel and Sharp: English Strategy under Edward III, 1327–1360. Woodbridge, Suffolk: Boydell & Brewer. OCLC 804338875.
- Rogers, Clifford (2004). Bachrach, Bernard S; DeVries, Kelly; Rogers, Clifford J (eds.). The Bergerac Campaign (1345) and the Generalship of Henry of Lancaster. Journal of Medieval Military History. Vol. II. Woodbridge: Boydell Press. ISBN 978-1843830405. ISSN 0961-7582.
- Rogers, Clifford J (2010). "Aiguillon, Siege of". In Rogers, Clifford J (ed.). The Oxford Encyclopedia of Medieval Warfare and Military Technology, Volume 1. New York: Oxford University Press. p. 12. ISBN 978-0195334036.
- Sumption, Jonathan (1990). Trial by Battle. The Hundred Years' War. Vol. I. London: Faber and Faber. ISBN 978-0571200955.
- Sumption, Jonathan (1999). Trial by Fire. The Hundred Years' War. Vol. II. London: Faber and Faber. ISBN 978-0571138968.
- Wagner, John A. (2006a). "Auberoche, Battle of (1345)". Encyclopedia of the Hundred Years War. Woodbridge, Suffolk: Greenwood. p. 3. ISBN 978-0313327360.
- Wagner, John A. (2006b). "Calais, Truce of (1347)". Encyclopedia of the Hundred Years War. Woodbridge, Suffolk: Greenwood. pp. 74–75. ISBN 978-0313327360.
- Wagner, John A. (2006c). "Neville's Cross, Battle of (1346)". Encyclopedia of the Hundred Years War. Woodbridge, Suffolk: Greenwood. pp. 228–229. ISBN 978-0313327360.
- Williamson, James Alexander (1944) [1931]. The Evolution of England: A Commentary on the Facts. Oxford: Clarendon Press. OCLC 984703073. Archived from the original on 9 July 2020.
