= Jean de Vienne (disambiguation) =

Jean de Vienne (1341-1396) was a French admiral.

Jean de Vienne may also refer to:

- Jean de Vienne (governor) (died 1351), governor of Calais and uncle of the admiral
- Jean de Vienne (bishop, died 1351), bishop of Avranches and Thérouanne and archbishop of Reims
- Jean de Vienne (bishop, died 1382), bishop of Metz and Basel and archbishop of Besançon
- French cruiser Jean de Vienne (launched 1935)
- French frigate Jean de Vienne (launched 1981)
