= Battle of Cassel =

The Battle of Cassel may refer to one of several battles near the town of Cassel, Nord, France:

- Battle of Cassel (1071) by Robert I of Flanders
- Battle of Cassel (1328) by Philip VI of France
- Battle of Cassel (1347) by John, Duke of Normandy
- Battle of Cassel (1677) by Philippe I of Orléans

Or to one of several battles and sieges involving the city of Kassel (formerly spelled Cassel) in Germany:

- Siege of Cassel (1761) during the Seven Years' War
- Siege of Cassel (1762) during the Seven Years' War
- Battle of Kassel (1813) during the Napoleonic Wars
- Battle of Kassel (1945) during the Second World War
