= Truce of Calais =

1347 truce between England and France

- Type: Time-limited truce
- Context: Hundred Years' War
- Drafted: September 1347
- Signed: 28 September 1347
- Location: Calais, France
- Effective: 28 September 1347
- Expiration: 7 July 1348; Repeatedly renewed until 1355
- Expiry: 1355
- Mediators: Two cardinals acting as emissaries for Pope Clement VI
- Original signatories: Edward III of England; Philip VI of France
- Signatories: John II of France
- Parties: Kingdom of England; Kingdom of France

The Truce of Calais (French: Trêve de Calais) was a truce agreed by King Edward III of England and King Philip VI of France on 28 September 1347, which was mediated by emissaries of Pope Clement VI. The Hundred Years' War had broken out in 1337 and in 1346 Edward had landed with an army in northern France. After inflicting a heavy defeat on Philip and a French army at the Battle of Crécy the English besieged Calais, which fell after 11 months. Both countries were financially and militarily exhausted and two cardinals acting for Pope Clement were able to broker a truce in a series of negotiations outside Calais. This was signed on 28 September to run until 7 July 1348.

Edward suggested extending the truce in May 1348, but Philip was keen to campaign. However, the effects of the Black Death, which spread to both kingdoms in 1348, caused the truce to be renewed in 1348, 1349 and 1350. While the truce was in effect neither country campaigned with a full field army, but it did not stop repeated naval clashes nor fighting in Gascony and Brittany. Philip died on 22 August 1350 and it was unclear whether the truce then lapsed, as it had been signed on his personal authority. His son and successor, John II, took to the field with a large army in south-west France. Once this campaign was successfully completed John authorised the renewal of the truce for one year to 10 September 1352. English adventurers seized the strategically located town of Guînes in January 1352, causing full-scale fighting to break out again, which went badly for the French.

Intermittent peace negotiations continued but were fruitless until 6 April 1354 when a new truce and an outline permanent peace treaty were agreed as the Treaty of Guînes. But John subsequently turned against it, deciding another round of warfare might leave him in a better negotiating position. The French planned an ambitious series of offensives for the 1355 campaigning season and repudiated the Treaty of Guînes early in the year. Yet another extension to the Truce of Calais was agreed, until 24 June, when it finally expired. The war resumed in force in October 1355. In September 1356 the French royal army was defeated by a smaller Anglo-Gascon force at the Battle of Poitiers and John was captured. In 1360 the fighting was brought to a temporary halt by the Treaty of Brétigny under which large areas of France were ceded to England. In 1369 large-scale fighting broke out again and the Hundred Years' War did not end until 1453, by which time England had lost all its territory in France other than Calais.

== Background ==
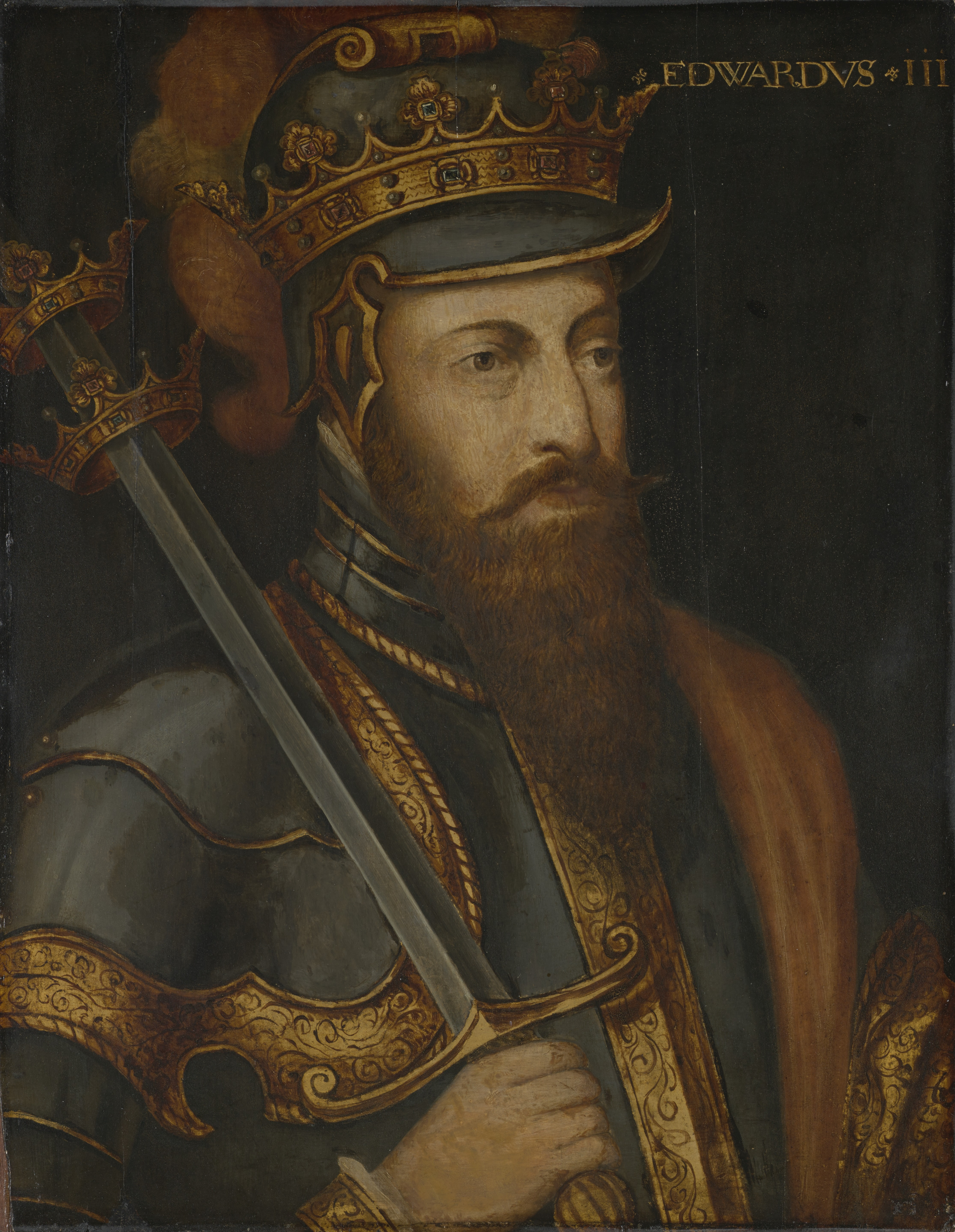
Edward III of England

Since 1153 the English Crown had controlled the Duchy of Aquitaine, which extended across a large part of south-west France. By the 1330s these holdings had been reduced to Gascony. A series of disagreements between France and England regarding the status of these lands culminated on 24 May 1337 in the council of the French king, Philip VI, declaring them forfeit. This marked the start of the Hundred Years' War, which was to last 116 years. In 1340 the English king, Edward III, as the closest male relative of Philip's predecessor Charles IV, laid formal claim to the Kingdom of France. This permitted his allies who were also vassals of the French crown to lawfully wage war on it, although Edward was not fully committed to this claim. In 1340 Edward campaigned against an army led by Philip in northern France. This ended with the agreement of the Truce of Esplechin in September by which the two kings agreed to cease hostilities for five years. The truce broke down within a year, although for several years subsequent fighting was largely limited to Brittany and Gascony.

In 1346 Edward raised an army in England and the largest fleet ever assembled by the English to that date, 747 ships. The fleet landed on 12 July at St. Vaast la Hoguein northern Normandy, 20 miles (32 km) from Cherbourg. The English army is estimated by modern historians to have been some 10,000 strong; it achieved complete strategic surprise and marched south. Edward's soldiers razed every town in their path and looted whatever they could from the populace. Caen, the cultural, political, religious and financial centre of north-west Normandy, was stormed and sacked. On 7 August, the English reached the Seine, 12 miles (19 km) south of Rouen, and raided up to its suburbs. Philip, under pressure from representatives of Pope Clement VI, sent envoys offering peace backed by a marriage alliance; Edward replied that he was not prepared to lose marching time to futile discussion and dismissed them. The English then left a swath of destruction, rapine and slaughter along the left bank of the Seine to Poissy, 20 miles (32 km) from Paris.

Map of the route of Edward III's chevauchée of 1346

The English turned north and became trapped in territory which the French had denuded of food. They escaped by fighting their way across the Somme against a French blocking force. Two days later, on 26 August 1346, fighting on ground of their own choosing, the English inflicted a heavy defeat on the French at the Battle of Crécy. The English continued to devastate the land and set several towns on fire, including Wissant, the normal port of disembarkation for English shipping to north-west France. Outside the burning town Edward held a council, which decided to capture Calais; an ideal entrepôt into France from an English point of view, possessing a secure harbour and established port facilities and being in the part of France closest to the ports of south-east England. It was also close to the border of Flanders and Edward's Flemish allies. The English arrived outside the town on 4 September and besieged it.

== Siege of Calais ==
Calais was strongly fortified. It was also surrounded by extensive marshes, some of them tidal, which made it difficult to find stable platforms for trebuchets and other artillery capable of breaching its walls. Calais was adequately garrisoned and provisioned, and could be reinforced and supplied by sea. Two cardinals representing Pope Clement travelled between the armies, but neither king would speak to them. Philip vacillated: on the day the siege of Calais began he disbanded most of his army to save money, convinced Edward had finished his raid and would proceed to Flanders and ship his army home. On 9 September Philip announced that the army would reassemble at Compiègne on 1 October, an impossibly short interval, and then march to the relief of Calais. Even though only 3,000 men-at-arms had assembled at Compiègne by 1 October the French treasurer was unable to pay them. Philip cancelled all offensive arrangements on 27 October and dispersed his army. Recriminations were rife: officials at all levels of the Chambre des Comptes (the French treasury) were dismissed and all financial affairs were put into the hands of a committee of three senior abbots. The King's council bent their efforts to blaming each other for the kingdom's misfortunes. Philip's heir, Duke John, fell out with his father and refused to attend court for several months. Joan II, Queen of Navarre, daughter of a king of France (Louis X), and previously a partisan of Philip, declared neutrality and signed a private truce with the English.

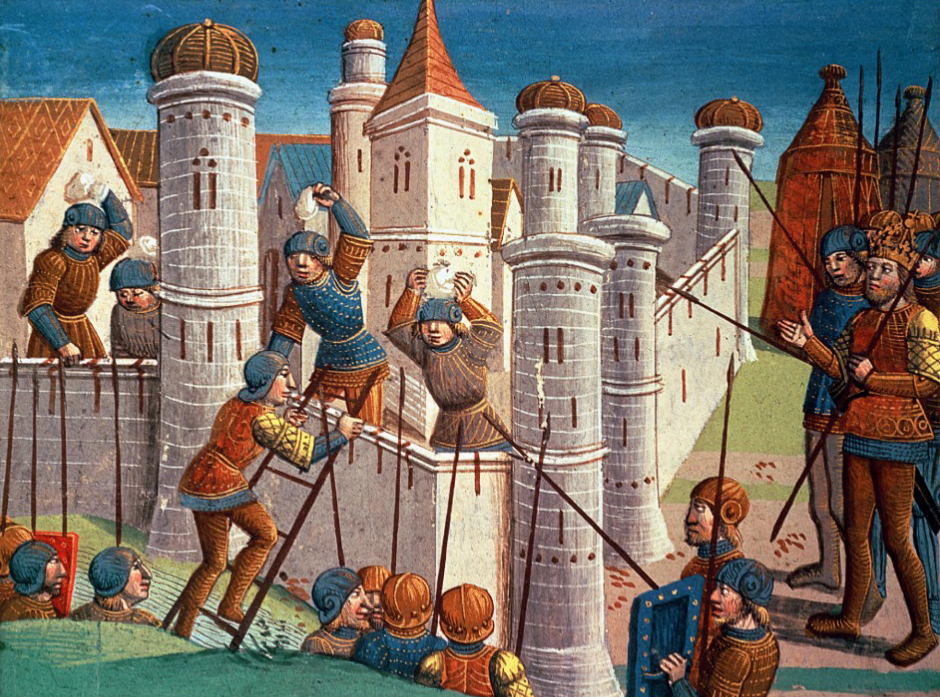
A medieval town under siege

Between mid-November and late February Edward made several attempts to breach the walls of Calais with trebuchets or cannon and to take the town by assault; all were unsuccessful. During March and April, more than 1,000 long tons (1,000 t) of supplies were run into Calais without opposition. Philip attempted to take the field in late April, but the French ability to assemble their army in a timely fashion had not improved since the autumn and by July it had still not fully mustered. Taxes proved ever more difficult to collect. Several French nobles sounded out the idea of switching their allegiance to Edward. Inconclusive fighting occurred in April and May: the French tried and failed to cut the English supply route to Flanders, and the English tried and failed to capture Saint-Omer and Lille. In June the French attempted to secure their flank by launching a major offensive against the Flemings; this was defeated at the Battle of Cassel.

In late April the English established a fortification on the end of a spit of sand to the north of Calais, which enabled them to command the entrance to the harbour. In May, June and July the French unsuccessfully attempted to force supply convoys through. Despite increasing financial difficulties, the English steadily reinforced their army through 1347, reaching a peak strength of 32,000. (Note: The largest English army to travel overseas before 1600.) More than 20,000 Flemings were gathered less than a day's march from Calais. 24,000 sailors, in a total of 853 ships, supported this force. (Note: This figure is separate from the 747 vessels involved in shipping the army to Normandy in July 1346.) On 17 July Philip led the French army north. On 27 July the French came within view of the town, 6 miles (10 km) away. Their army was between 15,000 and 20,000 strong; a third of the size of the combined English and Flemings, who had prepared earthworks and palisades across every approach. The English position clearly being unassailable, Philip finally admitted the Pope's representatives to an audience. They, in turn, arranged talks, but after four days of wrangling, these came to nothing. On 1 August the garrison of Calais, having observed the French army seemingly within reach for a week, signalled they were on the verge of surrender. That night the French army withdrew. On 3 August 1347 Calais surrendered. The entire French population was expelled. Edward repopulated the town with English and a few Flemings.

As soon as Calais capitulated, Edward paid off a large part of his army and released his Flemish allies. Philip in turn stood down the French army. Edward promptly launched strong raids up to 30 miles (48 km) into French territory. Philip attempted to recall his army, setting a date of 1 September, but experienced serious difficulties. His treasury was exhausted and taxes for the war had to be collected in many places at sword point. Despite these exigencies, ready cash was not forthcoming. The French army had little stomach for further conflict and Philip was reduced to threatening to confiscate the estates of nobles who refused to muster. He set back the date for his army to assemble by a month. Edward also had difficulties in raising money, partly because of the unexpected timing of the need; he employed draconian measures, which were extremely unpopular. The English also suffered two military setbacks: a large raid was routed by the French garrison of Saint-Omer; and a supply convoy en route to Calais was captured by French raiders from Boulogne.

== Truce ==
=== Philip VI ===
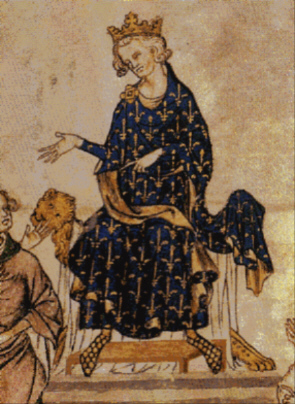
Philip VI of France

The two cardinals acting as papal emissaries from Pope Clement had been attempting to negotiate a halt to hostilities since July 1346, with no success. Given the military misfortunes and financial exhaustion of both sides, they found willing listeners in early September 1347. The principle of a temporary ceasefire was agreed and the cardinals drew up its detailed terms. These strongly favoured the English and confirmed their possession of all their territorial conquests in France and Scotland; the Flemish were confirmed in their de facto independence from France; and Philip was prevented from punishing those French nobles who had conspired, or even fought, against him. The truce was to run to 7 July 1348. On 28 September the truce was formally signed. It was named after the place it had been agreed and signed at: the Truce of Calais.

In November 1347 the French Estates General met and railed against the truce. In May 1348 Edward suggested extending the arrangement, but Philip refused; he was already raising an army in anticipation of the agreement's expiration. However, during 1348 the Black Death spread north across France, reaching Paris in August and becoming widespread in London by November. The plague was to eventually cause the death of approximately 45 per cent of the population of each country and it brought military preparations to a halt. In late August representatives of the two kings met in Boulogne and began negotiations for an extension of the truce. On 13 November it was extended until 1 September 1349. The following year it was extended to May 1350 and in June 1350 once again extended to August 1351. In practice, while the truce was in effect neither country campaigned with a full field army, but it did not stop the ongoing naval clashes between the two countries nor the fighting in Gascony and Brittany.

=== John II ===
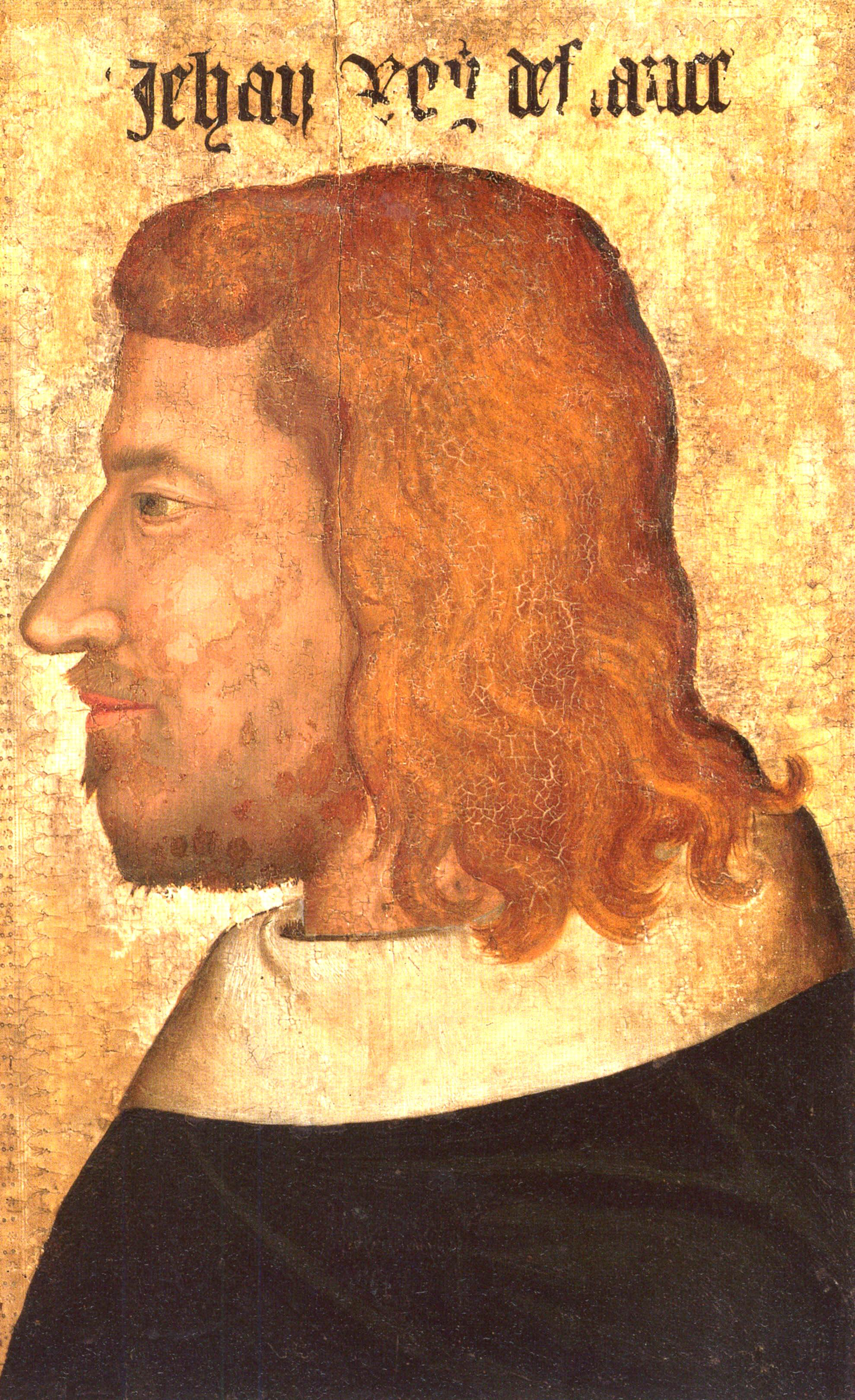
John II

Philip died on 22 August 1350 and it was unclear whether the truce then lapsed, as it had been signed on his personal authority. His son and successor, John II, declined to clarify the situation while taking to the field with a large army. A French offensive in Gascony in south-west France made good progress in 1351 and the English response was ineffectual. While this was happening negotiations to renew the truce opened at Guînes, 13 kilometres (8 mi) south of Calais, on 7 July, but made slow progress. Eventually, a modification of the original treaty was agreed upon, but the French delayed signing it. Once their campaign in the south west was successfully completed John authorised the new truce, which was formally agreed on 11 September to last one year. As ever, the truce was patchily observed, with the fighting in the south west hardly abating.

When English adventurers seized the strategically located town of Guînes in January 1352, full-scale fighting broke out again. This did not go well for the French; money and enthusiasm for the war ran out and state institutions ceased to function. Encouraged by the new pope, Innocent VI, negotiations for a permanent peace treaty opened at Guînes in early March 1353. These broke down and on 8 May the French cancelled the truce and announcing an arrière-ban for Normandy, a formal call to arms for all able-bodied males. The negotiators met briefly in Paris on 26 July and extended the truce until November, although all concerned understood that much fighting would continue.

=== Treaty of Guînes ===
French central and local governments collapsed. French nobles took to violently settling old scores rather than fighting the English. Charles of Navarre, one of the most powerful figures in France, broke into the bedroom of the Constable of France, Charles of Spain, and murdered him as he knelt naked, pleading for his life. Navarre then boasted of it and made tentative approaches to the English regarding an alliance. Navarre and John formally reconciled in March 1354 and a new balance within the French government was reached; this was more in favour of peace with England, in some quarters at almost any price. Informal talks started again at Guînes in mid-March. The principle whereby Edward abandoned his claim to the French throne in exchange for French territory was agreed; Edward gave his assent to this on 30 March. Formal negotiations recommenced in early April. Discussions were rapidly concluded. The truce was extended for another year and the broad outline of a permanent peace was agreed. On 6 April 1354 these heads of terms were formally signed by the representatives of both countries as the Treaty of Guînes. The prolongation of the truce was to be immediately publicised, while the fact that the outline of a peace treaty had been agreed was to be kept secret until 1 October, when Innocent would announce it at the papal palace in Avignon. In the same ceremony English representatives would repudiate the English claim to John's throne and the French would formally relinquish sovereignty over several provinces in south-west France to the English. Edward was overjoyed, the English parliament ratified the treaty sight unseen. John also endorsed the treaty, but members of his council were less enthusiastic.

The English adhered to the truce. John of Armagnac, the French commander in the south west, ignored his orders to observe the peace, but his offensive was ineffective. Details of how much of the treaty was known to the French ruling elite and their debates regarding it are lacking, but sentiment was against its terms. In August it was revealed that several of the men who had negotiated and signed the treaty had been deeply involved in the plot to murder Charles of Spain. At least three of John's closest councillors fled his court or were expelled. By early September the French court had turned against the treaty. The date of the formal ceremony in Avignon was cancelled, with uncertainty as to when, or if, it would be rescheduled.

=== Collapse of the truce ===
In November 1354 John seized all Navarre's lands, besieging those places which did not surrender. Planned negotiations in Avignon to finalise the details of the treaty did not take place in the absence of French ambassadors. John decided another round of warfare might leave him in a better negotiating position and the French planned an ambitious series of offensives for the 1355 campaigning season. The French ambassadors arrived in Avignon in mid-January 1355, repudiated the previous agreement and attempted to reopen negotiations. The English and the Cardinal of Boulogne pressed them to adhere to the existing treaty. The impasse continued for a month. Simultaneously the English delegation plotted an anti-French alliance with Navarre. By the end of February, the futility of their official missions was obvious to all and the delegations departed with much acrimony. Their one achievement was a formal extension of the ill-observed truce to 24 June. It was clear that from then both sides would be committed to full-scale war. In April 1355 two papal emissaries appealed to Edward and his council to extend the Truce of Calais once again, but they were rebuffed and the agreement finally lapsed.

== Aftermath ==
The war resumed in force in October 1355, with both Edward and his son, Edward the Black Prince, fighting in separate campaigns in France. In September 1356 the French royal army was defeated by a smaller Anglo-Gascon force at the Battle of Poitiers and John was captured. In 1360 the fighting was brought to a temporary halt by the Treaty of Brétigny, which largely replicated the Treaty of Guînes, with slightly less generous terms for the English. By this treaty large areas of France were ceded to England. In 1369 large-scale fighting broke out again and the Hundred Years' War did not end until 1453, by which time England had lost all its territory in France other than Calais. Calais was finally lost following a siege in 1558.

== Notes, citations and sources ==
=== References ===
- Allmand, Christopher (1989). The Hundred Years' War: England and France at War, c. 1300–c. 1450. Cambridge Medieval Textbooks. Cambridge: Cambridge University Press. ISBN 978-0521319232.
- Ayton, Andrew (2007) [2005]. "The English Army at Crécy". In Ayton, Andrew & Preston, Philip (eds.). The Battle of Crécy, 1346. Woodbridge, Suffolk: Boydell Press. pp. 159–251. ISBN 978-1843831150.
- Burne, Alfred (1999) [1955]. The Crécy War. Ware, Hertfordshire: Wordsworth Editions. ISBN 978-1840222104.
- Christakos, George; Olea, Ricardo A.; Serre, Marc L.; Yu, Hwa-Lung; Wang, Lin-Lin (2005). Interdisciplinary Public Health Reasoning and Epidemic Modelling: the Case of Black Death. Berlin; Heidelberg; New York: Springer. ISBN 978-3540257943.
- Curry, Anne (2002). The Hundred Years' War 1337–1453. Essential Histories. Oxford: Osprey Publishing. ISBN 978-1841762692.
- DeVries, Kelly (1998) [1996]. Infantry Warfare in the Early Fourteenth Century: Discipline, Tactics, and Technology. Woodbridge, Suffolk; Rochester, New York: Boydell Press. ISBN 978-0851155715.
- Fowler, Kenneth Alan (1969). The King's Lieutenant: Henry of Grosmont, First Duke of Lancaster, 1310–1361. New York: Barnes & Noble. ISBN 978-0389010036. OCLC 164491035.
- Hardy, Robert (2010) [1976]. Longbow: a Social and Military History (PDF). Yeovil, Somerset: Haynes Publishing. ISBN 978-1852606206. Archived (PDF) from the original on 6 December 2018.
- Jaques, Tony (2007). Dictionary of Battles and Sieges. Westport, Connecticut: Greenwood Publishing. ISBN 978-0313335372.
- Lambert, Craig (2011). "Edward III's Siege of Calais: A Reappraisal". Journal of Medieval History. 37 (3): 245–256. doi:10.1016/j.jmedhist.2011.05.002. ISSN 0304-4181. S2CID 159935247.
- Lewis, Carenza (June 2016). "Disaster Recovery: New Archaeological Evidence for the Long-Term Impact of the 'Calamitous' Fourteenth Century". Antiquity. 90 (351): 777–797. doi:10.15184/aqy.2016.69. ISSN 0003-598X. S2CID 164178697.
- Oman, Charles (1998) [1924]. A History of the Art of War in the Middle Ages: 1278–1485 A.D. London: Greenhill Books. ISBN 978-1853673320.
- Ormrod, W. Mark (1990). Edward III. New Haven, Connecticut: Yale University Press. ISBN 978-0300055061.
- Ormrod, W. Mark (2008) [2004]. "Crécy and Calais, 1346–1347". Oxford Dictionary of National Biography (online ed.). Oxford University Press. doi:10.1093/ref:odnb/8519. ISBN 978-0198614128. (Subscription, Wikipedia Library access or UK public library membership required.)
- Rodger, N.A.M. (2004). The Safeguard of the Sea. London: Penguin. ISBN 978-0140297249.
- Rogers, Clifford J. (1994). "Edward III and the Dialectics of Strategy, 1327–1360". Transactions of the Royal Historical Society. Vol. 4. Cambridge: Cambridge University Press on behalf of the Royal Historical Society. pp. 83–102. doi:10.2307/3679216. JSTOR 3679216. OCLC 931311378. S2CID 163041276.
- Rogers, Clifford J. (2014) [2000]. War Cruel and Sharp: English Strategy under Edward III, 1327–1360. Woodbridge, Suffolk: Boydell & Brewer. OCLC 804338875.
- Sumption, Jonathan (1990). Trial by Battle. The Hundred Years' War. Vol. I. London: Faber and Faber. ISBN 978-0571200955.
- Sumption, Jonathan (1999). Trial by Fire. The Hundred Years' War. Vol. II. London: Faber and Faber. ISBN 978-0571138968.
- Wagner, John A. (2006). "Hundred Years' War, Phases of". Encyclopedia of the Hundred Years War. Woodbridge, Suffolk: Greenwood. pp. 160–164. ISBN 978-0313327360.
- Wagner, John A. (2006b). "Calais, Truce of (1347)". Encyclopedia of the Hundred Years War. Woodbridge, Suffolk: Greenwood. pp. 74–75. ISBN 978-0313327360.
