= Jean de Vienne (governor) =

14th-century French noble

Jean de Vienne (died 4 August 1351), lord of Pollans and Rohtelanges, was a French nobleman.

Jean was a son of Jean de Vienne, lord of Pagny, Seignelay and Pollans and Catherine de Jonvelle. He was the French commander of Mortagne in 1340 and governor of Calais during the siege of Calais undertaken by King Edward III of England starting on 4 September 1346. After a long siege, Jean was forced to capitulate on 3 August 1347.

He died on 4 August 1351 in Paris, France.

== Bibliography ==
- Wagner, John A. (2006). "Jean de Vienne". Encyclopedia of the Hundred Years War. Woodbridge, Suffolk: Greenwood. ISBN 978-0313327360.
