= Siege of Calais (1346–1347) =

Siege by King Edward III during the Hundred Years' War

- Part of the Crécy campaign during the Hundred Years' War
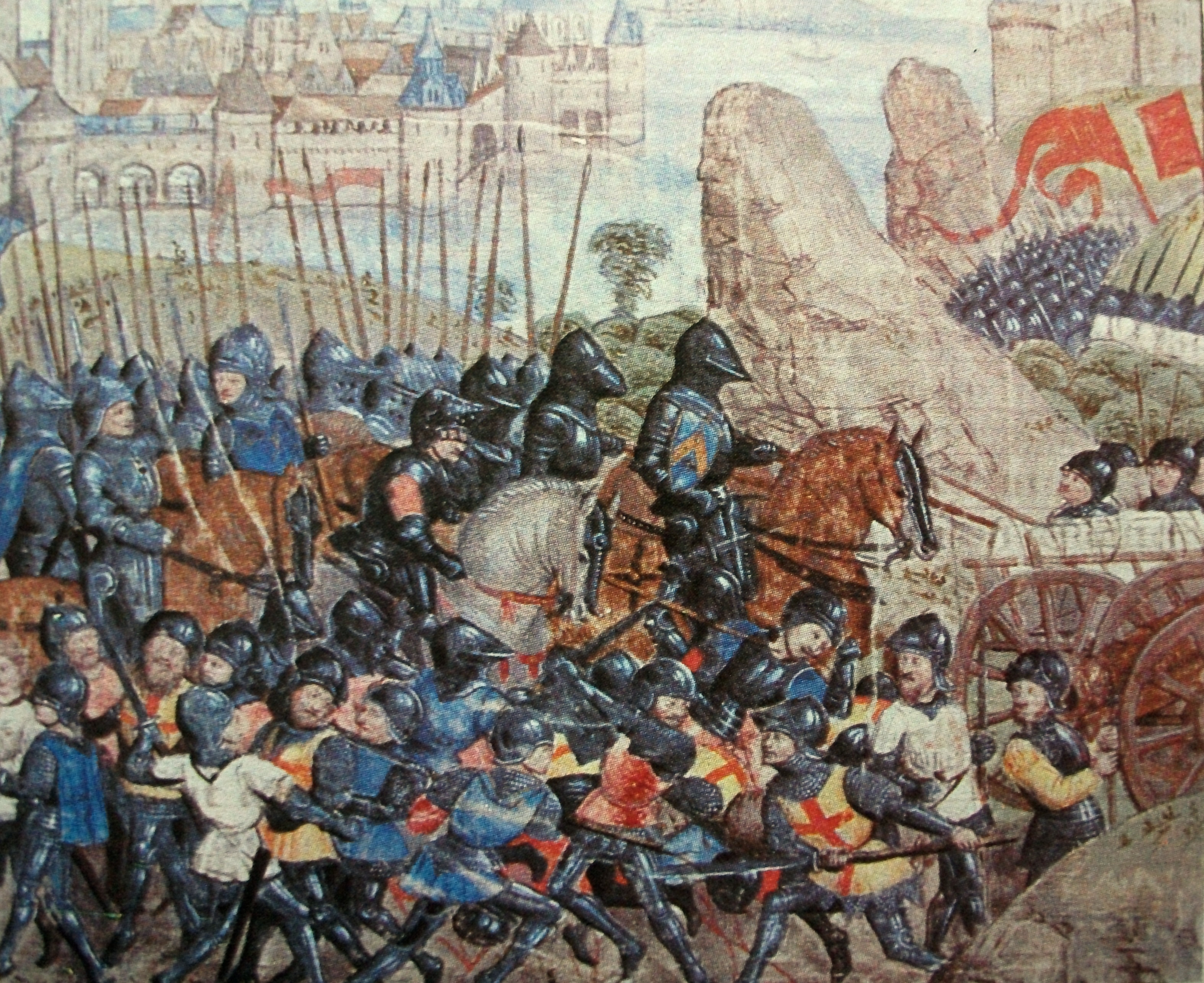
- A medieval depiction of the siege of Calais
| Date | 4 September 1346 – 3 August 1347 |
| Location | Calais, France 50.9580°N 1.8530°E |
| Result | English victory |

Belligerents
| Kingdom of England | Kingdom of France |

Commanders and leaders
| Edward III Edward the Black Prince | Jean de Vienne |

Strength
| • Between 5,000 and 32,000 soldiers at different times • Up to 20,000 Flemish allies • Up to 24,000 sailors in the supporting fleet | • Garrison size – unknown • Field army – up to 20,000 |

The siege of Calais (4 September 1346 – 3 August 1347) occurred at the conclusion of the Crécy campaign, when an English army under the command of King Edward III of England successfully besieged the French town of Calais during the Edwardian phase of the Hundred Years' War.

The English army of some 10,000 men had landed in northern Normandy on 12 July 1346. They embarked on a large-scale raid, or chevauchée, devastating large parts of northern France. On 26 August 1346, fighting on ground of their own choosing, the English inflicted a heavy defeat on a large French army led by their king Philip VI at the Battle of Crécy. A week later the English invested the well-fortified port of Calais, which had a strong garrison under the command of Jean de Vienne. Edward made several unsuccessful attempts to breach the walls or to take the town by assault, either from the land or seaward sides. During the winter and spring the French were able to run in supplies and reinforcements by sea, but in late April the English established a fortification which enabled them to command the entrance to the harbour and cut off the further flow of supplies.

On 25 June Jean de Vienne wrote to Philip stating that their food was exhausted. On 17 July Philip marched north with an army estimated at between 15,000 and 20,000 men. Confronted with a well-entrenched English and Flemish force of more than 50,000, he withdrew. On 3 August Calais capitulated. It provided the English with an important strategic lodgement for the remainder of the Hundred Years' War and beyond. The port was not recaptured by the French until 1558.

== Background ==
Since the Norman Conquest of 1066, English monarchs had held titles and lands within France, the possession of which made them vassals of the kings of France. The status of the English king's French fiefs was a major source of conflict between the two monarchies throughout the Middle Ages. French monarchs systematically sought to check the growth of English power, stripping away lands as the opportunity arose. Over the centuries, English holdings in France had varied in size, but by 1337 only Gascony in south-western France was left. The Gascons preferred their relationship with a distant English king who left them alone, to one with a French king who would interfere in their affairs. Following a series of disagreements between Philip VI of France (r. 1328–1350) and Edward III of England (r. 1327–1377), on 24 May 1337 Philip's Great Council in Paris agreed that Gascony and Ponthieu should be taken back into Philip's hands on the grounds that Edward was in breach of his obligations as a vassal. This marked the start of the Hundred Years' War, which was to last 116 years.

== Prelude ==
Map of the route of Edward III's chevauchée of 1346

Although Gascony was the cause of the war, Edward was able to spare few resources for it; whenever an English army had campaigned on the continent, it had operated in northern France. In 1346 Edward raised an army in England and the largest fleet ever assembled by the English to that date, 747 ships. The fleet landed on 12 July at St. Vaast la Hogue, 20 miles (32 km) from Cherbourg. The English army is estimated by modern historians to have been some 10,000 strong, and consisted of English and Welsh soldiers and a small number of German and Breton mercenaries and allies. The English achieved complete strategic surprise and marched south.

Edward's aim was to conduct a chevauchée, a large-scale raid, across French territory to reduce his opponent's morale and wealth. His soldiers razed every town in their path and looted whatever they could from the populace. The English fleet paralleled the army's route and landing parties devastated the country for up to 5 miles (8 km) inland, taking vast amounts of loot; after their crews filled their holds, many ships deserted. They also captured or burnt more than 100 French ships; 61 of these had been converted into military vessels. Caen, the cultural, political, religious and financial centre of north-west Normandy, was stormed on 26 July. Most of the population was massacred, there was an orgy of drunken rape and the city was sacked for five days. The English army marched out towards the River Seine on 1 August.

They devastated the country to the suburbs of Rouen before leaving a swath of destruction, rape and slaughter along the left bank of the Seine to Poissy, 20 miles (32 km) from Paris. Duke John of Normandy, Philip's oldest son and heir, had been in charge of France's main army, campaigning in the English occupied province of Gascony in south-west France; Philip ordered him north, to reinforce the army facing Edward. Meanwhile, the English had turned north and become trapped in territory which the French had denuded of food. They escaped by fighting their way across the Somme against a French blocking force. Two days later, on 26 August 1346, fighting on ground of their own choosing, the English inflicted a heavy defeat on the French at the Battle of Crécy.

== Siege ==
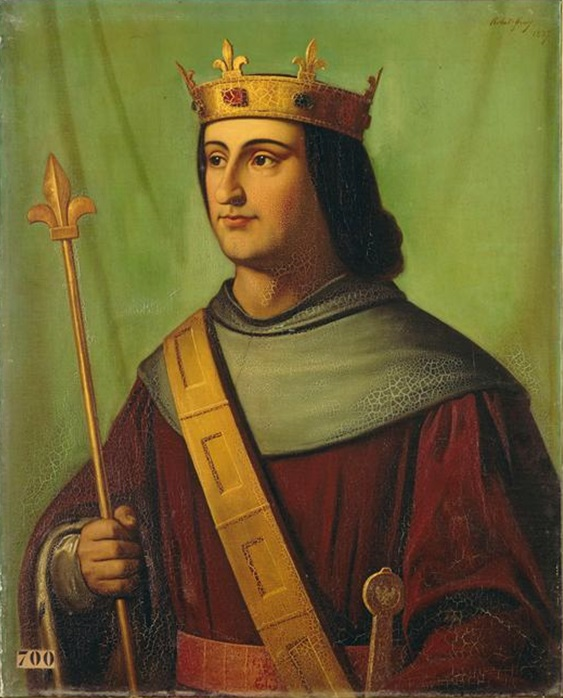
Philip VI of France, as imagined in the 19th century

After resting for two days and burying the dead, the English, requiring supplies and reinforcements, marched north. They continued to devastate the land, and razed several towns, including Wissant, the normal port of disembarkation for English shipping to north-east France. Outside the burning town Edward held a council, which decided to capture Calais. The city was an ideal entrepôt from an English point of view, and close to the border of Flanders and Edward's Flemish allies. The English arrived outside the town on 4 September and besieged it.

Calais was strongly fortified: it boasted a double moat, substantial city walls, and its citadel in the north-west corner had its own moat and additional fortifications. It was surrounded by extensive marshes, some of them tidal, making it difficult to find stable platforms for trebuchets and other artillery, or to mine the walls. It was adequately garrisoned and provisioned, and was under the command of the experienced Jean de Vienne. It could be readily reinforced and supplied by sea. The day after the siege commenced, English ships arrived offshore and resupplied, re-equipped and reinforced the English army. The English settled down for a lengthy stay, establishing a thriving camp to the west, Nouville, or "New Town", with two market days each week. A major victualling operation drew on sources throughout England and Wales to supply the besiegers, as well as overland from nearby Flanders. A total of 853 ships, crewed by 24,000 sailors, were involved over the course of the siege; (Note: This is separate from the 747 vessels involved in shipping the army to Normandy in July 1346.) an unprecedented effort. Wearied by nine years of war, Parliament grudgingly agreed to fund the siege. Edward declared it a matter of honour and avowed his intent to remain until the town fell. Two cardinals acting as emissaries from Pope Clement VI, who had been unsuccessfully attempting to negotiate a halt to hostilities since July 1346, continued to travel between the armies, but neither king would speak to them.

=== French disorder ===
Philip vacillated: on the day the siege of Calais began he disbanded most of his army to save money, convinced that Edward had finished his chevauchée and would proceed to Flanders and ship his army home. On or shortly after 7 September, Duke John made contact with Philip, having already disbanded his own army. On 9 September Philip announced that the army would reassemble at Compiègne on 1 October, an impossibly short interval, and then march to the relief of Calais. Among other consequences, this equivocation allowed the English forces in the south west, under the Duke of Lancaster, to launch offensives into Quercy and the Bazadais; and launch a major raid 160 miles (260 km) north through Saintonge, Aunis and Poitou, capturing numerous towns, castles and smaller fortified places and storming the rich city of Poitiers. These offensives completely disrupted the French defences and shifted the focus of the fighting from the heart of Gascony to 60 miles (97 km) or more beyond its borders. Few French troops had arrived at Compiègne by 1 October and as Philip and his court waited for the numbers to swell, news of Lancaster's conquests came in. It was believed that Lancaster was heading for Paris, and in order to block this the French changed the assembly point for any men not already committed to Compiègne to Orléans, and reinforced them with some of those already mustered. After Lancaster turned south to head back to Gascony, those Frenchmen already at or heading towards Orléans were redirected to Compiègne; French planning collapsed into chaos.

Since June Philip had been calling on the Scots to fulfil their obligation under the terms of the Auld Alliance and invade England. The Scottish king, David II, convinced that English force was focused entirely on France, obliged on 7 October. He was brought to battle at Neville's Cross on 17 October by a smaller English force raised exclusively from the northern English counties. The battle ended with the rout of the Scots, the capture of their king and the death or capture of most of their leadership. Strategically this freed English resources for the war against France, and the English border counties were able to guard against the remaining Scottish threat from their own resources.

Even though only 3,000 men-at-arms had assembled at Compiègne, the French treasurer was unable to pay them. Philip cancelled all offensive arrangements on 27 October and dispersed his army. Recriminations were rife: the Marshal of France, Charles de Montmorency, was sacked; officials at all levels of the Chambre des Comptes (the French treasury) were dismissed; all financial affairs were put into the hands of a committee of three senior abbots; the King's council bent their efforts to blaming each other for the kingdom's misfortunes; Duke John fell out with his father and refused to attend court for several months; Joan of Navarre, daughter of an earlier king of France (Louis X) and previously a staunch supporter of Philip, declared neutrality, signed a private truce with Lancaster, and denied Philip access to Navarrese fortifications – Philip was considerably chagrined, but unable to counter this.

=== Military operations ===
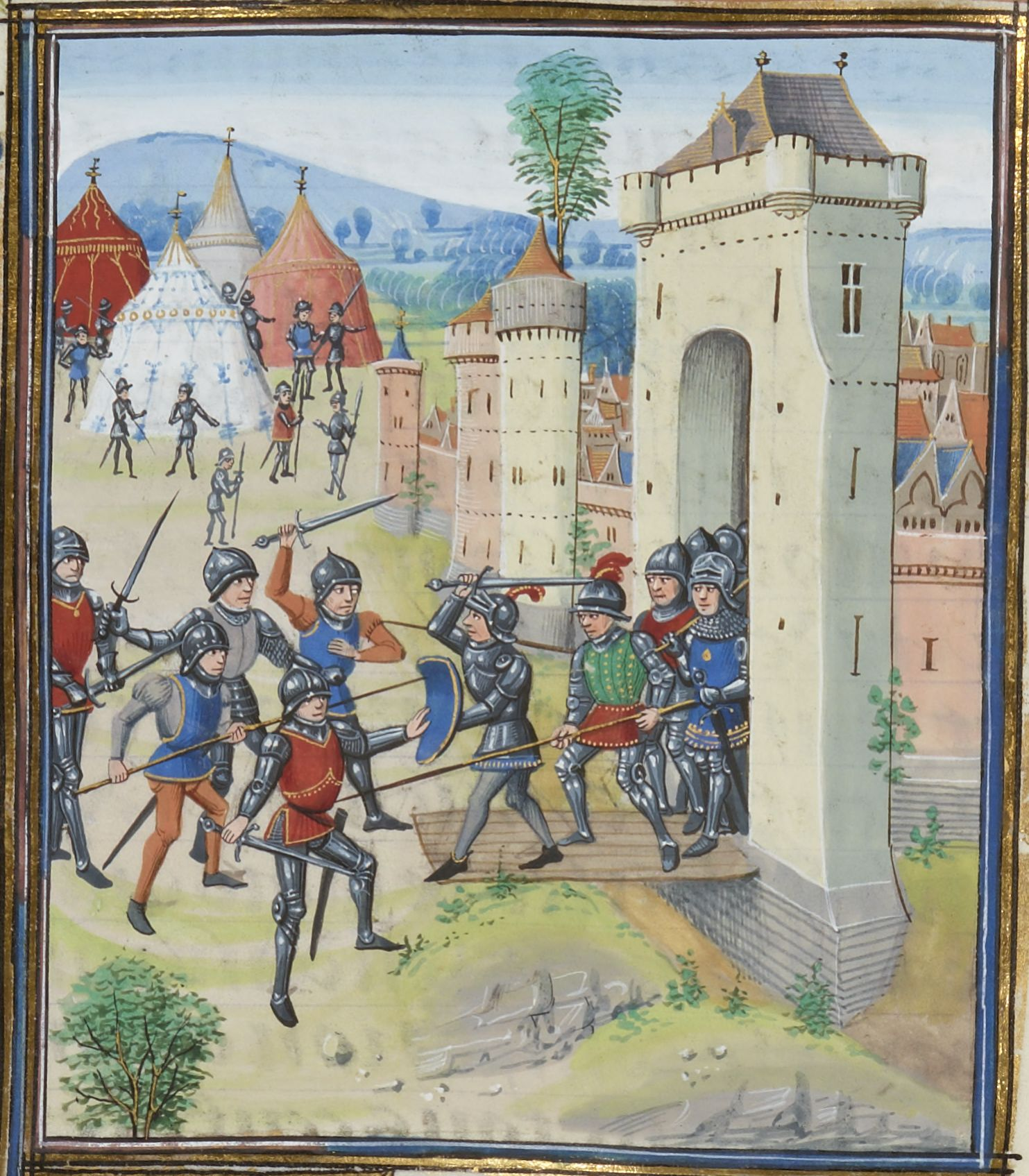
A medieval town under assault; miniature from a chronicle by Jean Froissart

During the winter of 1346–47 the English army shrank, possibly to as few as 5,000 men at some points. This was due to: many soldiers' terms of service expiring; a deliberate reduction by Edward for reasons of economy; an outbreak of dysentery in Neuville which caused major loss of life; (Note: The contemporary chronicler Thomas of Burton claimed that dysentery halved the effective strength of the English army, and that it was God's punishment for the large number of prostitutes in Nouville.) and widespread desertion. Despite his reduced numbers, between mid-November and late February Edward made several attempts to breach the walls with trebuchets or cannon, or to take the town by assault, either from the land or seaward sides; all were unsuccessful. During the winter the French made great efforts to strengthen their naval resources. This included French and mercenary Italian galleys and French merchant ships, many adapted for military use. During March and April, more than 1,000 long tons (1,000 t) of supplies were run into Calais without opposition. Philip attempted to take the field with his army in late April, but the French ability to assemble in a timely fashion had not improved since the autumn and by July it had still not fully mustered. Taxes proved ever more difficult to collect, with many towns using all available funds to reinforce their walls or equip their militia, and much of the nobility crippled by debt they had accumulated paying for the previous nine years of war. Several French nobles suggested to Edward that they may switch their allegiance. Inconclusive fighting occurred in April and May: the French tried and failed to cut the English supply route to Flanders, while the English tried and failed to capture Saint-Omer and Lille. In June the French attempted to secure their flank by launching a major offensive against the Flemings; this was defeated at Cassel.

Early in 1347 Edward took steps to substantially increase the size of his army; in large part he was able to do this because the Scottish army's threat to the north of England and the French navy's threat to the south were much reduced. It is known, for example, that he ordered the recruitment of 7,200 archers; this is nearly as many men as the entire invasion force of the previous year. In late April the English established a fortification on the end of the spit of sand to the north of Calais, which enabled them to command the entrance to the harbour and prevent any further supplies reaching the garrison. In May, June and July the French attempted to force convoys through, unsuccessfully. On 25 June the commander of the Calais garrison wrote to Philip stating that their food was exhausted and suggesting that they may have to resort to cannibalism. Despite increasing financial difficulties, the English steadily reinforced their army through 1347, reaching a peak strength of 32,000; the largest English army to be deployed overseas prior to 1600. 20,000 Flemings were gathered within a day's march of Calais. English shipping ran an effective ferry service to the siege from June 1347, bringing in supplies, equipment and reinforcements.

On 17 July Philip led the French army north. Alerted to this, Edward called the Flemings to Calais. On 27 July the French came within view of the town, 6 miles (10 km) away. Their army was between 15,000 and 20,000 strong; a third of the size of the English and their allies, who had prepared earthworks and palisades across every approach. The English position was clearly unassailable. In an attempt to save face, Philip now admitted the Pope's emissaries to an audience. They in turn arranged talks, but after four days of wrangling these came to nothing. On 1 August the garrison of Calais, having observed the French army seemingly within reach for a week, signalled that they were on the verge of surrender. That night the French army withdrew. On 3 August 1347 Calais surrendered. The entire French population was expelled. A vast amount of booty was found within the town. Edward repopulated the town with English settlers.

== Subsequent activities ==
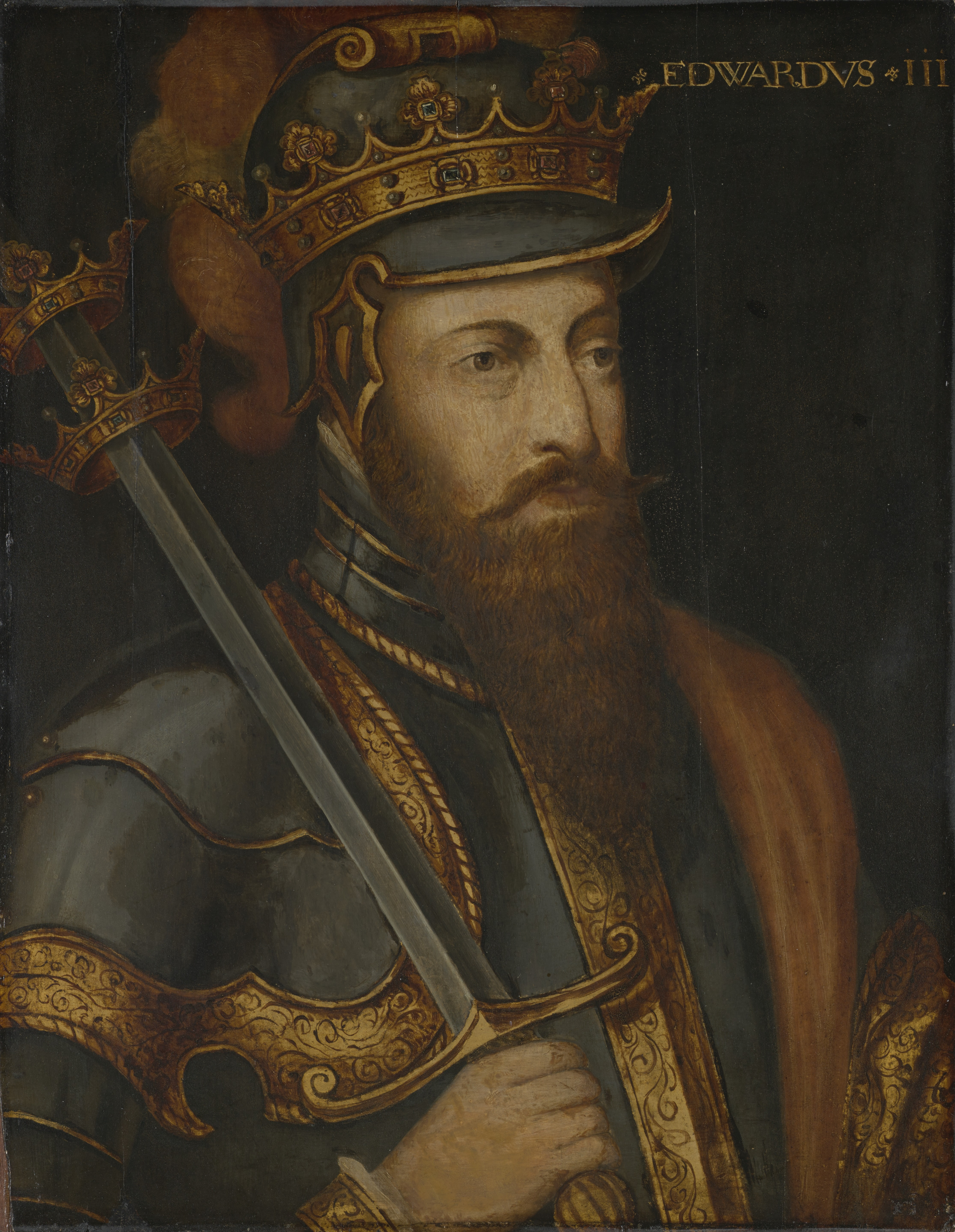
Edward III of England, a portrait from the 18th century

As soon as Calais capitulated, Edward paid off a large part of his army and released his Flemish allies. Philip in turn stood down the French army. Edward promptly launched strong raids up to 30 miles (48 km) into French territory. Philip attempted to recall his army, setting a date of 1 September, but experienced serious difficulties. His treasury was exhausted and taxes for the war had to be collected in many places at sword point. Despite these exigencies, ready cash was not forthcoming. The French army had little stomach for further conflict, and Philip was reduced to threatening to confiscate the estates of nobles who refused to muster. He set back the date for his army to assemble by a month. Edward also had difficulties in raising money, partly due to the unexpected timing of the need; he employed draconian measures, which were extremely unpopular. The English also suffered a pair of military setbacks: a large raid was routed by the French garrison of Saint-Omer; and a supply convoy en route to Calais was captured by French raiders from Boulogne.

Given the military misfortunes and financial exhaustion of both sides, the Pope's emissaries now found willing listeners. Negotiations began on 4 September and by the 28th a truce had been agreed. The treaty strongly favoured the English, and confirmed them in possession of all of their territorial conquests. The Truce of Calais was agreed to run for nine months to 7 July 1348, but was extended repeatedly over the years until it was formally set aside in 1355. The truce did not stop the ongoing naval clashes between the two countries, nor the fighting in Gascony and Brittany. After full-scale war resumed in 1355 it continued until 1360, when it ended in an English victory with the Treaty of Brétigny. The period of the chevauchée, from the landing in Normandy to the fall of Calais, became known as Edward III's annus mirabilis (year of marvels).

== Aftermath ==
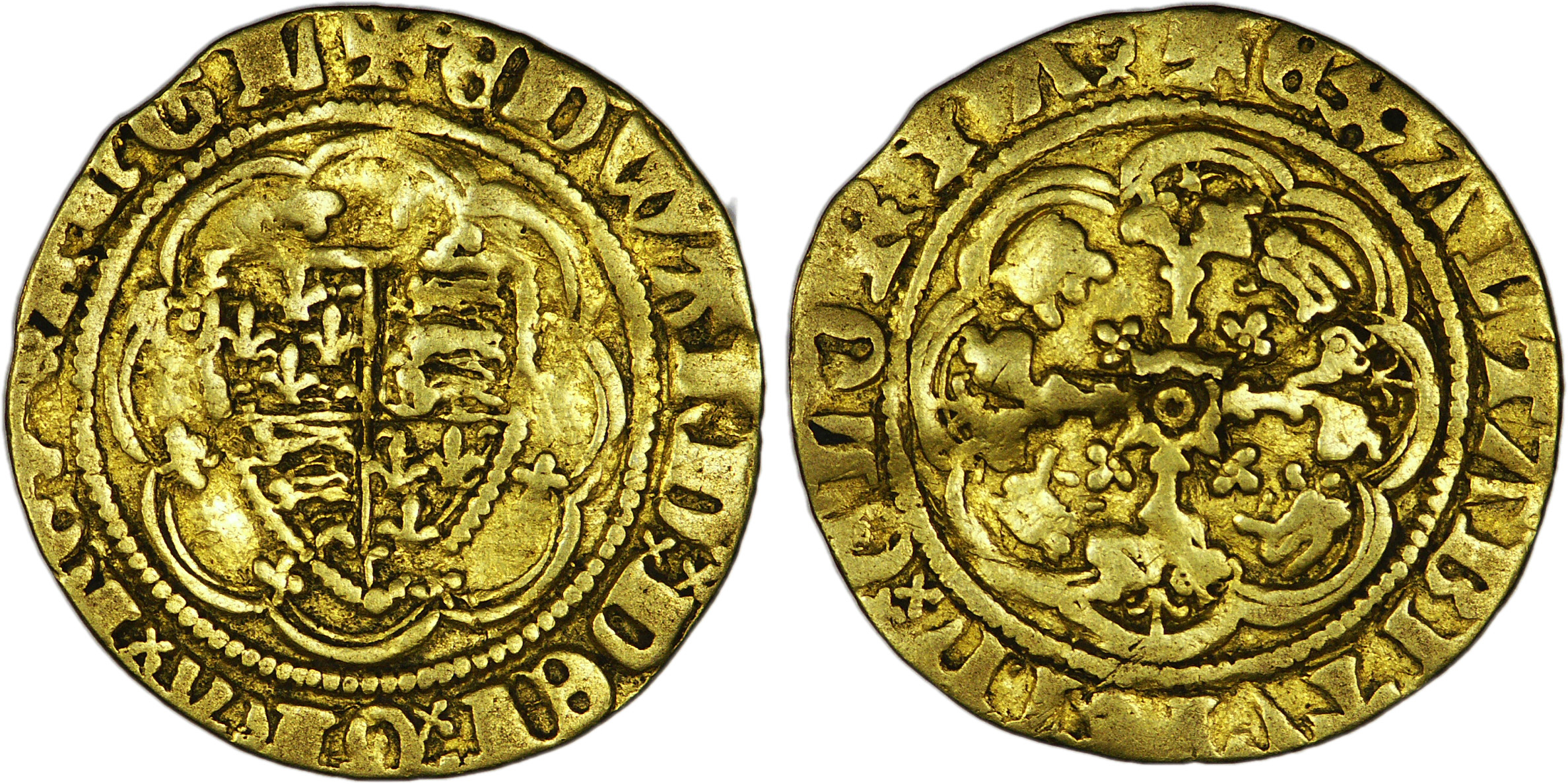
Gold quarter noble of Edward III minted in Calais between 1361 and 1369

Calais was vital to England's effort against the French for the rest of the war, it being all but impossible to land a large force other than at a friendly port. It also allowed the accumulation of supplies and materiel prior to a campaign. A ring of substantial fortifications defending the approaches to Calais were rapidly constructed, marking the boundary of an area known as the Pale of Calais. The town had an extremely large standing garrison of 1,400 men, virtually a small army, under the overall command of the Captain of Calais, who had numerous deputies and specialist under-officers. Edward granted Calais numerous trade concessions or privileges and it became the main port of entry for English exports to the continent, a position which it still holds. Calais was finally lost by the English monarch Mary I, following the 1558 siege of Calais. The fall of Calais marked the loss of England's last possession in mainland France.

== Memorials ==
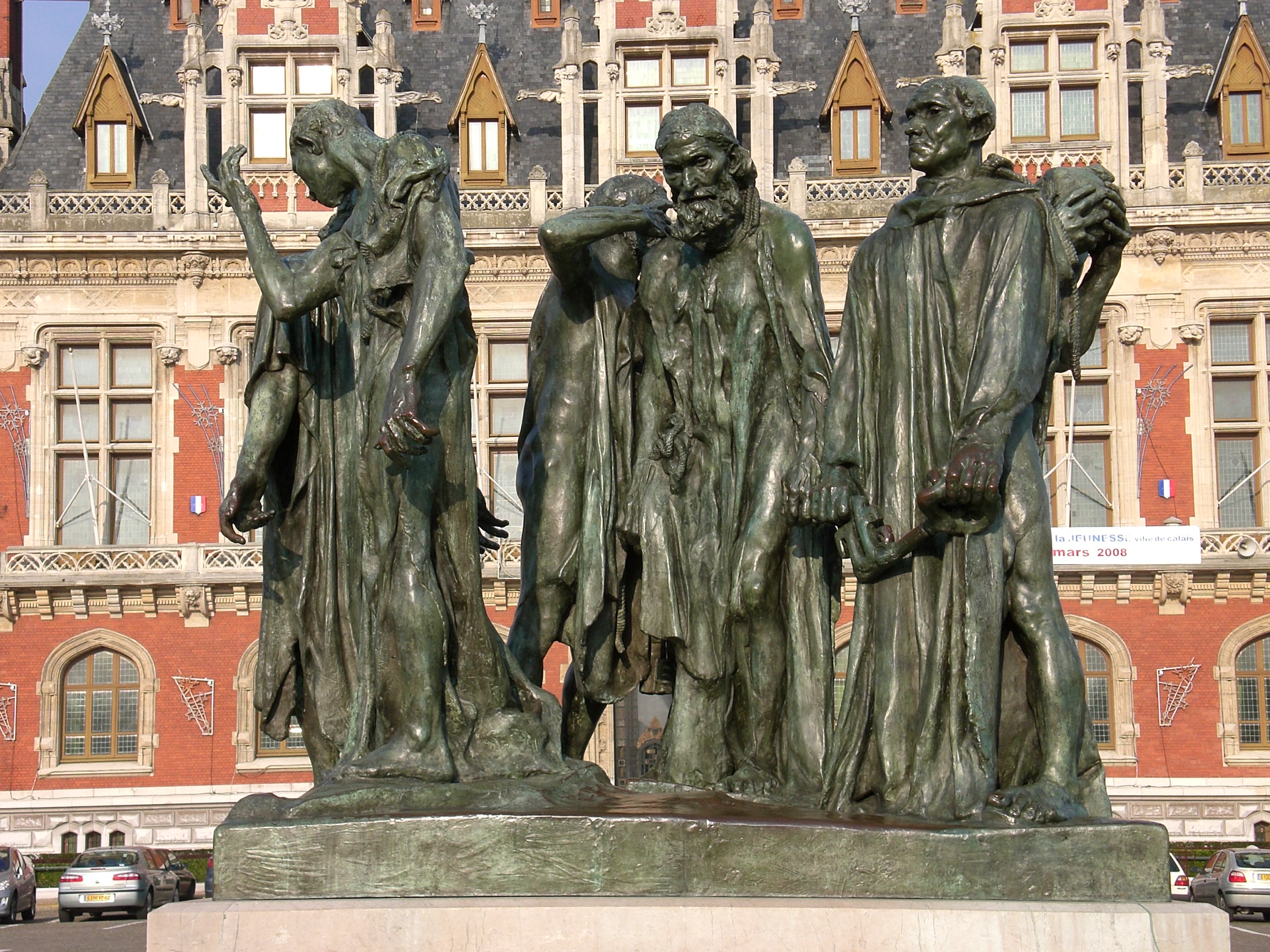
The Burghers of Calais by Auguste Rodin

In 1884, Calais commissioned a statue by Auguste Rodin of the town leaders at the moment of their surrender to Edward. The resulting work, The Burghers of Calais, was completed in 1889. An account by the contemporary chronicler Froissart claims that the burghers expected to be executed, but their lives were spared by the intervention of England's queen, Philippa of Hainault, Froissart's patron, who persuaded her husband to exercise mercy.

== Notes, citations and sources ==
=== Sources ===
- Adams, Simon (27 March 2017). "Siege of Calais – Summary". Encyclopædia Britannica.
- Allmand, Christopher (1989). The Hundred Years' War: England and France at War, c. 1300–c. 1450. (Cambridge Medieval Textbooks). Cambridge: Cambridge University Press. ISBN 978-0521319232.
- Burne, Alfred (1999). The Crecy War. Ware, Hertfordshire: Wordsworth Editions. ISBN 978-1840222104.
- Corfis, Ivy & Wolfe, Michael (1999). The Medieval City Under Siege. Woodbridge, Suffolk; Rochester, NY: Boydell Press. ISBN 978-0851157566.
- Crowcroft, Robert & Cannon, John (2015). "Gascony". The Oxford Companion to British History. Oxford: Oxford University Press. p. 389. ISBN 978-0199677832.
- Curry, Anne (2002). The Hundred Years' War 1337–1453. Essential Histories. Oxford: Osprey Publishing. ISBN 978-1841762692.
- DeVries, Kelly (1998) [1996]. Infantry Warfare in the Early Fourteenth Century: Discipline, Tactics, and Technology. Woodbridge, Suffolk; Rochester, New York: Boydell Press. ISBN 978-0851155715.
- Fowler, Kenneth Alan (1969). The King's Lieutenant: Henry of Grosmont, First Duke of Lancaster, 1310–1361. New York: Barnes & Noble. ISBN 978-0389010036. OCLC 164491035.
- Froissart, Jean (1908). G.C. Macaulay (ed.). The Chronicles of Froissart. Translated by John Bourchier, Lord Berners. London: MacMillan. ISBN 978-0585049083. OCLC 2925301.
- Hardy, Robert (2010). Longbow: a Social and Military History (PDF). Yeovil, Somerset: Haynes Publishing. ISBN 978-1852606206.
- Harris, Robin (1994). Valois Guyenne. Royal Historical Society Studies in History. Vol. 71. London: Boydell Press. ISBN 978-0-86193-226-9.
- Jaques, Tony (2007). Dictionary of Battles and Sieges. Westport, Conn.: Greenwood Publishing Group. ISBN 978-0313335372.
- Jianou, Ionel (1970). Rodin. Translated by Muston, Kathleen; Skelding, Geoffrey. Paris: Arted. OCLC 901206171.
- Lacey, Robert (2008). Great Tales from English History. London: Folio Society. OCLC 261939337.
- Lambert, Craig (2011). "Edward III's Siege of Calais: A Reappraisal". Journal of Medieval History. 37 (3): 245–256. doi:10.1016/j.jmedhist.2011.05.002. ISSN 0304-4181. S2CID 159935247.
- Nicholson, Ranald (1974). Scotland: The Later Middle Ages. University of Edinburgh History of Scotland. Edinburgh: Oliver and Boyd. ISBN 978-0050020388.
- Oman, Charles (1998) [1924]. A History of the Art of War in the Middle Ages: 1278–1485 A.D. London: Greenhill Books. ISBN 978-1853673320.
- Ormrod, W. Mark (1990). Edward III. New Haven: Yale University Press. ISBN 978-0300055061.
- Ormrod, W. Mark (2008). "Crécy and Calais, 1346–1347". Oxford Dictionary of National Biography (online ed.). Oxford University Press. doi:10.1093/ref:odnb/8519. ISBN 978-0-19-861412-8. (Subscription, Wikipedia Library access or UK public library membership required.)
- Penman, Michael (2004). David II. East Linton, East Lothian: Tuckwell Press. ISBN 978-1862322028.
- Prestwich, M. (13 September 2007). J.M. Roberts (ed.). Plantagenet England 1225–1360. Oxford: Oxford University Press. ISBN 978-0199226870.
- Rodger, N. A. M. (2004). The Safeguard of the Sea. London: Penguin. ISBN 978-0140297249.
- Rogers, Clifford J. (1994). "Edward III and the Dialectics of Strategy, 1327–1360". Transactions of the Royal Historical Society. Vol. 4. Cambridge: Cambridge University Press on behalf of the Royal Historical Society. pp. 83–102. doi:10.2307/3679216. JSTOR 3679216. OCLC 931311378. S2CID 163041276.
- Rogers, Clifford J. (2004). "The Bergerac Campaign (1345) and the Generalship of Henry of Lancaster". In Bachrach, Bernard S; DeVries, Kelly & Rogers, Clifford J (eds.). Journal of Medieval Military History. Vol. II. Woodbridge: Boydell Press. ISBN 978-1843830405. ISSN 0961-7582.
- Rogers, Clifford J. (2010). "Aiguillon, Siege of". In Rogers, Clifford J (ed.). The Oxford Encyclopedia of Medieval Warfare and Military Technology, Volume 1. New York: Oxford University Press. p. 12. ISBN 978-0195334036.
- Sumption, Jonathan (1990). Trial by Battle. The Hundred Years' War. Vol. I. London: Faber and Faber. ISBN 978-0571200955.
- Sumption, Jonathan (1999). Trial by Fire. The Hundred Years' War. Vol. II. London: Faber and Faber. ISBN 978-0571138968.
- Wagner, John A. (2006a). "Calais". Encyclopedia of the Hundred Years War. Woodbridge, Suffolk: Greenwood. pp. 72–73. ISBN 978-0313327360.
- Wagner, John A. (2006b). "Calais, Siege of (1346–1347)". Encyclopedia of the Hundred Years War. Woodbridge, Suffolk: Greenwood. pp. 73–74. ISBN 978-0313327360.
- Wagner, John A. (2006c). "Calais, Truce of (1347)". Encyclopedia of the Hundred Years War. Woodbridge, Suffolk: Greenwood. pp. 74–75. ISBN 978-0313327360.
- Wagner, John A. (2006d). "Neville's Cross, Battle of (1346)". Encyclopedia of the Hundred Years War. Woodbridge, Suffolk: Greenwood. pp. 228–229. ISBN 978-0313327360.
