= Pourlans =

- Commune
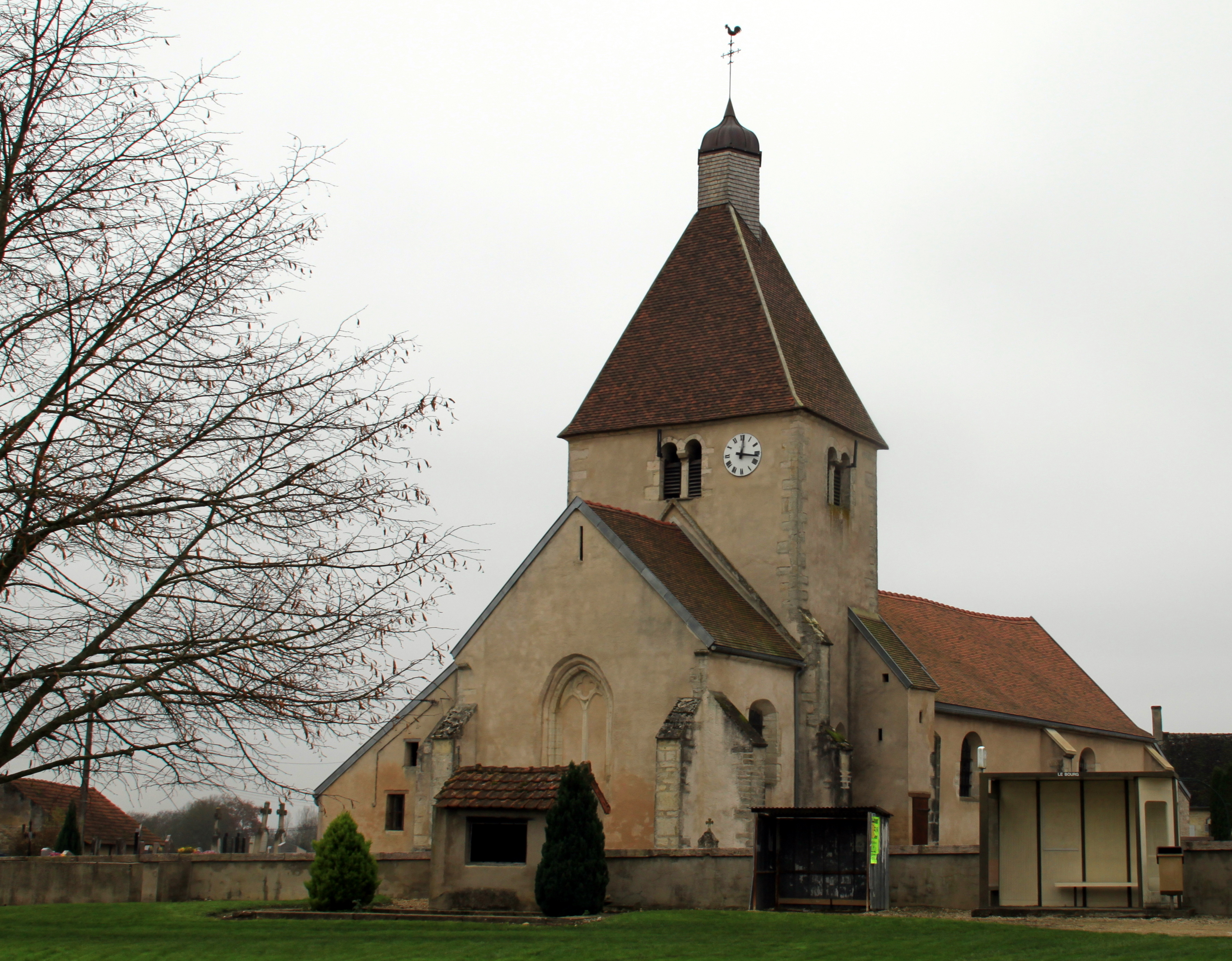
- The church in Pourlans
- Location of Pourlans
- Location within France Location within Bourgogne-Franche-Comté
- Coordinates: 46°57′28″N 5°14′22″E
- Country: France
- Region: Bourgogne-Franche-Comté
- Department: Saône-et-Loire
- Arrondissement: Louhans
- Canton: Pierre-de-Bresse
- Area^{1}: 16.04 km^{2} (6.19 sq mi)
- Elevation: 210 m (690 ft)
- Highest elevation: 196 m (643 ft)
- Lowest elevation: 177 m (581 ft)
- Population (2023): 220
  - Density: 14/km^{2} (36/sq mi)
- Time zone: UTC+01:00 (CET)
  - Summer (DST): UTC+02:00 (CEST)
- INSEE/Postal code: 71357 /71270
- ^{1} French Land Register data, which excludes lakes, ponds, glaciers > 1 km^{2} (0.386 sq mi or 247 acres) and river estuaries.

Pourlans (French pronunciation: [puʁlɑ̃]) is a commune in Saône-et-Loire department in the region of Bourgogne-Franche-Comté in eastern France.

== See also ==
- Communes of the Saône-et-Loire department
