= Chevauchée =

Raiding method of medieval warfare

A chevauchée (French pronunciation: [ʃəvoʃe], "promenade" or "horse charge", depending on context) was a raiding method of medieval warfare for weakening the enemy, primarily by burning and pillaging enemy territory in order to reduce the productivity of a region, in addition to siege warfare most often as part of wars of conquest but occasionally as a punitive raid. The use of the chevauchée declined at the end of the 14th century as the focus of warfare turned to sieges. It is conceptually similar to the scorched earth strategies used in modern warfare.

In Spain, this type of raid was usually called a cabalgada (older spelling: cavalgada). The Ghazi razzia is also considered similar in purpose.

The chevauchée could be used as a way of forcing an enemy to fight, or as a means of discrediting the enemy's government and detaching his subjects from their loyalty. This usually caused a massive flight of refugees to fortified towns and castles, which would be untouched by the chevauchée.

== Early examples ==
The chevauchée has gained recognition for its use during the Hundred Years' War between the Kingdom of England and the Kingdom of France. It was not a new tactic and had been used many times before; for example, William the Conqueror used the tactic before the Battle of Hastings to encourage Harold to engage in a battle. During the Hundred Years' War the tactic was used more frequently, on a larger scale and more systematically than before.

In medieval Bedouin culture, ghazwa was a form of limited warfare verging on brigandage that avoided head-on confrontations and instead emphasized raiding and looting. The Umayyad-period poet al-Kutami wrote the oft-quoted verses: "Our business is to make raids on the enemy, on our neighbor and our own brother, in the event we find none to raid but a brother." William Montgomery Watt hypothesized that Muhammad found it useful to divert this continuous internecine warfare toward non-Muslims, making it the basis of the Islamic holy war. As a form of warfare, the razzia was then mimicked by the Christian states of Iberia in their relations with the taifa states.

The word algara referred to either a raiding party, or perhaps to a yet small raid. A 12th-century Christian chronicler wrote: "Every day large bodies of knights leave castles on what we call algarades and roam far and wide, pillaging all the territory of Seville, Córdoba and Carmona, and setting it all alight."

A 13th-century Iberian example of a raid called cavalgada is the operation launched at the order of Ferdinand III of Castile in April 1231. It departed from Andújar, and first advanced towards Córdoba, leaving a trail of destruction in its path. The raiders hit Palma del Río, killing many inhabitants. Thereafter they proceeded as far as Seville, which they bypassed heading towards Jerez and Vejer. When they were intercepted by an army of Ibn Hud near the Guadalete river, the battle of Jerez occurred. The Castilian raiders managed to rout the Moorish army, and withdrew with booty, but not before they killed all their prisoners. The raid and battle were amply described in the chronicles of Alfonso X of Castile.

== Development ==
According to historian Kelly DeVries, chevauchée tactics developed into a regular strategy in the Hundred Years' War following the Black Death when Edward III of England no longer had the troops to engage in regular battles. Specific tactics were "a quick cavalry raid through the countryside with the intention of pillaging unfortified villages and towns, destroying crops and houses, stealing livestock, and generally disrupting and terrorizing rural society."

Most of the troops used in a chevauchée during the Hundred Years' War were made up of light horse or hobelars. The mercenary groups known as the 'free companies' were also prominent in using the chevauchée."

== Notable uses ==
Although often considered to be a tactic characteristic of mercenaries, the chevauchée was also undertaken by famous medieval captains.

=== War of the Two Peters ===
During the War of the Two Peters, a period of near constant fighting from 1356 to 1379 in Spain, the forces of the Kingdom of Castile continually destroyed grain, olive trees, and vineyards in the Kingdom of Valencia until nothing remained to be harvested. The Spanish word for this type of operation was cavalgada. A cavalgada however did not refer strictly to an operation by mounted troops; it could well refer to a surprise raiding attack carried by infantry alone. After 1340, the Early Reconquista was over, and for more than a century thereafter, warfare between Granada and its Christian neighbors consisted largely of cavalgadas and razzias.

=== Hundred Years' War ===
English armies often resorted to the chevauchée during the Hundred Years' War with France. After the fall of Calais to the English in 1347, Edward III of England launched many raids into the French interior as he sensed the French weakness. Edward, the Black Prince, took his mounted force into Artois, while Henry of Grosmont, 1st Duke of Lancaster, burned Fauquembergues to the ground.

Shortly thereafter, Edward III decided to lead a grand chevauchée with his whole army into the heart of France from Calais at the beginning of September. However, the starting date came and passed, because while morale was high, his forces were just as exhausted as the French. A truce was agreed upon between the French and the English in that same month, which disappointed some in his army who were eager for loot.

In 1355–1356, Edward the Black Prince led a chevauchée from Bordeaux to the French Mediterranean coast, resulting in much destruction and another challenge to French supremacy. Extra defenses were built at Tours to deter the Black Prince from attacking the town.

During the 1370s, the English launched chevauchées led by Robert Knolles and John of Gaunt, 1st Duke of Lancaster, the third surviving son of Edward III, but little was achieved militarily.

Tactics began to change during Henry V's campaign in Normandy in 1417–20. The deliberate practice of depriving the French king of troops and taxes by ruining his people and their livelihoods was ended for a lighter approach.

==== 1346 Crécy campaign ====
The Crécy campaign was a large-scale chevauchée conducted by an English army throughout northern France in 1346, which devastated a significant amount of the French countryside and culminated in the eponymous Battle of Crécy. The campaign began on 12 July 1346, with the landing of English troops in Normandy, and ended with the fall of Calais on 3 August 1347. The English army was led by Edward III, while the French army was led by Philip VI of France.

==== 1346 campaign of Henry of Grosmont ====
Henry of Grosmont, 1st Duke of Lancaster, led a chevauchée between 12 September and 31 October 1346. His Anglo-Gascon force, consisting of 2,000 soldiers, marched 160 miles (260 kilometres) north from Gascony and sacked Saint-Jean-d'Angély and Poitiers. After sacking Poitiers, his force pillaged much of Saintonge, Aunis and Poitou, and captured many towns and castles, including Rochefort and Oléron.

==== 1355 campaign of the Black Prince ====
The chevauchée by Edward, the Black Prince, in the autumn of 1355 was one of the most destructive in the history of English warfare.

Starting from Bordeaux, the Black Prince traveled south into lands controlled by Jean I, Comte d'Armagnac with Toulouse as the apparent ultimate target. Edward departed with an Anglo-Gascon force of 5,000 men. He laid waste to the lands of Armagnac and also despoiled the Comté de Foix before turning eastward into Languedoc.

The count of Armagnac reinforced his fortresses instead of engaging Edward. The residents of Toulouse prepared for a siege as Edward approached, but he was not equipped for a difficult siege and bypassed the city, crossing two rivers to the south that the French had thought impassable by a large force and had hence left unguarded.

Edward continued south, pillaging and burning and causing a great deal of mayhem. While the forces of Armagnac remained in Toulouse, Edward backtracked across the two rivers without much harassment. Only after it was apparent that Edward was departing did Armagnac harass the English. After the campaign, Armagnac was rebuked by James I, Count of La Marche, Constable of France and lost great favor with the people of Toulouse for his cowardice and lack of generalship.

The result of this chevauchée by the Black Prince was that the important city of Toulouse realized that they were on their own to protect themselves and were forced to become militarily self-reliant. This process repeated itself throughout France in the wake of a chevauchée. Toulouse became an essential part of the country's security over the next two centuries. The chevauchée of 1355 was the only time during the Hundred Years' War that Toulouse was seriously threatened.

Unlike large cities such as Toulouse, the rural French villages were not built or organized to provide a defense. With these small villages lacking much in the way of fortifications, they were much more attractive targets to members of a chevauchée. In the absence of great walls, villagers picked a building, often a stone church, in which to defend themselves. They surrounded the church with ditches and stocked it with stones and crossbows. Even with these measures, peasants did not stand much of a chance against the professional fighters of a chevauchée. Even if these measures of self-defense were successful for a short while, resistance could not be maintained for long, and surrendering after resisting was often more costly than immediately surrendering. While there was an established practice of holding nobles and knights for ransom, villagers would most often not be able to pay the ransom that made it worth a pillager's time to take someone hostage, instead of just killing them. Therefore, it is not surprising that the peasant villages put up whatever meager resistance that they could.

==== 1356 campaign of the Black Prince ====
In the summer of 1356, the Black Prince undertook a second great chevauchée. This too lacked a clear objective. Edward had an estimated 7,000 men under his command. The chevauchée began on 4 August 1356, against the city of Bourges. This chevauchée differed from the first in that, in addition to the raiding, burning and looting, there was also military action taken against objectives away from the main body of the force. Edward burned the suburbs of Bourges, but did not capture the city.

Several small forces of French knights were defeated and Edward paused to besiege and capture the small town of Romorantin, where several French leaders were holed up. By this time the army of John II of France was in pursuit.

Edward marched West along the Loire River to Tours, burning the suburbs before marching south. By this time the French army was only thirty miles (48 km) away and had superior numbers. The French pursued faster than the English marched. By 18 September 1356, Edward entered Poitiers. The next day, outside the city, the Battle of Poitiers was fought, which resulted in a great English victory and the capture of John II of France, who eventually died in captivity after his large ransom, twice the yearly income of France, went unpaid.

==== 1373 campaign of John of Gaunt ====
In August 1373, John of Gaunt, accompanied by John de Montfort, Duke of Brittany led a force of 9,000 men out from Calais on a major chevauchée. While initially successful as French forces were insufficiently concentrated to oppose them, the English began to meet further resistance as they moved south. French forces began to concentrate around the English force but, under specific orders from King Charles V, the French avoided a set battle. Instead, they fell on forces detached from the main body to raid or forage. The French shadowed the English and in October, the English found themselves being trapped against the River Allier by four separate French forces. With some difficulty, the English crossed at the bridge at Moulins but lost all their baggage and loot. The English carried on south across the Limousin plateau but the weather turned severe. Men and horses died in great numbers and many soldiers, forced to march on foot, discarded their armour. At the beginning of December, the army finally entered friendly territory in Gascony. By the end of December they were in Bordeaux, starving, ill-equipped and having lost over half of the 30,000 horses with which they had left Calais. Although the march across France had been a remarkable feat, it was a military failure.

==== 1380 campaign of the Earl of Buckingham ====
In July 1380, the Earl of Buckingham commanded an expedition to France to aid England's ally the Duke of Brittany. The French refused battle before the walls of Troyes on 25 August, so Buckingham's forces continued their chevauchée and in November laid siege to Nantes. However, expected support from the Duke of Brittany did not appear and, in the face of heavy losses in both men and horses, Buckingham was forced to abandon the siege in January 1381. In February 1381 Brittany, reconciled to the regime of the new French king, Charles VI, and paid 50,000 francs to Buckingham to abandon the siege and the campaign.

==== In the 15th century ====
The French campaigns of Henry V of England provided new opportunities for the use of the chevauchée by English armies. One not particularly successful example in March 1416 led to the Battle of Valmont. By the 1420s, many important French towns were under English control, including Caen, Falaise, Cherbourg and Rouen. This decreased the need for the chevauchée as the focus to the conquest of France. After Henry's death, the situation for the English worsened. Sir John Fastolf, an experienced English commander, proposed in a 1435 memorandum a return to aggressive chevauchée tactics. His recommendations were not, however, taken up.

== Popular culture ==
A table-top miniature wargame called Chevauchée, designed to simulate the action associated with this term, was published at one point by the game development company Skirmisher Publishing LLC.

== See also ==
- Early thermal weapons: fire and sword
- Hit-and-run tactics
- Horses in the Middle Ages
- Scorched earth
- Sherman's March to the Sea
