= Battle of Cassel (1347) =

- Part of Hundred Years' War
Date	1347
Location	Cassel, Northern France
Result	Flemish Victory

Belligerents
Kingdom of France	County of Flanders

Commanders and leaders
John, Duke of Normandy	Unknown

Casualties and losses
Unknown	Unknown

The Battle of Cassel, was an action by the French to secure their flanks during the English siege of Calais in 1347.
