= Tournaisis campaign of 1340 =

Military campaign of 1340 during the Hundred Years' War

Tournaisis campaign of 1340 Tournai Campaign
- Part of the Hundred Years' War
Location	Northern France & Flanders
Result	French victory

Belligerents
Kingdom of England; County of Flanders; Holy Roman Empire; County of Hainaut	Kingdom of France

Commanders and leaders
King Edward III	King Philip VI

The Tournaisis campaign of 1340, also known as the Tournai Campaign, was a military campaign of King Edward III of England during the Hundred Years War. The English army was supported by Flemish, Hainault, Brabant and Holy Roman Empire forces. The campaign resulted in the defeat of an Anglo-Flemish force, carrying out a small scale chevauchée in the County of Artois, at the Battle of Saint-Omer, an unsuccessful siege of Tournai and ended with meeting of the English and French armies at Bouvines without battle. The campaign ended with the Truce of Espléchin and the withdrawal of the English led forces. The English army was led by King Edward III, and the French by King Philip VI of France.

== Aftermath ==
The truce was broken in 1341, when conflict erupted between English and French forces over the succession to the Duchy of Brittany. Edward III, backed John de Montfort, and Philip VI, backed Charles of Blois.
