= 1345 Liverpool riot =

Historical event in England

- Location: Liverpool, England
- Date: 14 February 1345
- Attack type: Riot

The 1345 Liverpool riot took place on St Valentine's Day when a large body of armed men entered the town of Liverpool and attacked the courts.

== Period of disorder ==
The period around 1345 was a time of much public disorder, particularly in the north. In Carlisle, men "led by a most wiked spirit" effectively made a local truce with the Scots, who frequently invaded England at this time. It was thought at the time that they intended to surrender the city and Castle, and allow a "hostile invasion". The following year riots took place in which several citizens and members of the castle guard were injured. It does not appear that the disorder was linked to food scarcity, although this may have been a factor, as war preparations diverted the food supply more than usual. Rather, it has been posited that the number of men being recruited in the north for Edward III's newly-instigated war in France. There was probably increasing enmity between townsmen and the mayor and corporation, who were accused of drawing and hanging several citizens while allowing Scots to dwell in peace, even when indicted by the Crown. Other major disturbances took place in Newcastle upon Tyne, this time between the town burgesses and the friars minor. The former broke the doors and smashed the locks of the priory, while diverting the friars' water supply for the town's use.

== Liverpool riots ==
Magnus conflictus in campo de Lyverpoole inter illos 1344 de Ratcliffe ex una parte et illos de Trafford ex altera. Unde Robertus Ratcliffe vicecomes occisus est et xiiii altera parte.

(I.e., "A great conflict on the field of Liverpool between those of Ratcliffe on one side and those of Trafford on the other. Whereupon Robert Ratcliffe, sheriff, was slain, and xiii on the other side.")

— Annals of Whalley Abbey, fol. 165, classified as BL Cotton MS Vespasian A5, which were completed by 1346. (Note: They were subsequently transcribed and abridged by M. V. Taylor in 1913.)

Robert Ratcliffe had been sheriff of Lancashire between 1342 and 1344, and had represented the county in Parliament in 1338.

Having "feloniously and seditiously" unfurled banners, the mob broke into the court—while the Justices of the Peace were in session—and began abusing them. What began with hurling insults escalated into violence, and swiftly following their "'insulting and contumacious words", the armed mob "did wickedly kill, mutilate, and plunder of their goods, and wound very many persons there assembled, and further did prevent the justices from showing justice" as they were due to.

A Commission of the Peace was held three weeks later to bring to justice those involved; many of whom, it was discovered, were propertied men. By July, Henry, Earl of Lancaster had ensured that most of them had received royal pardons on condition that they joined his military campaign to Gascony. Recent scholarship has indicated that the riots were an extension of an ongoing feud between two gentry families, the Radcliffe and Trafford families, all of whose retainers were later found among the accused.

There were a number of casualties among each family. Of the Traffords, says the Victoria County History, "Geoffrey son of Sir Henry de Trafford; Richard de Trafford, son of Sir John the elder, and John and Robert his brothers; also Richard brother of Henry de Trafford" were all killed. Robert Ratcliffe also died on the day of the riot, but in his particular case, there is some uncertainty whether his death was directly the result of injuries sustained in the riot.

== Bibliography ==
- Cohn, S. K. (2013). Popular Protest in Late Medieval English Towns. Cambridge: Cambridge University Press. ISBN 978-1-10702-780-0.
- Stewart-Brown (1933). "Two Medieval Liverpool Affrays". Transactions of the Historic Society of Lancashire and Cheshire. 85: 7187. OCLC 79946806.
- Taylor (1913). "The 16th Century Abbots of St Werburgh's, Chester". Journal of the Chester Archaeological Society. 19: 162–196. doi:10.5284/1070027. OCLC 4122309.
- V.C.H. (1911). "Liverpool: The castle and development of the town". British History Online. Victoria County History.
