= Edwardian Wars =

Edwardian Wars may refer to:

- Wars of Edward I of England (13th century):
  - Second Barons' War
  - Lord Edward's crusade
  - Conquest of Wales by Edward I
- Edwardian War (14th century), see Hundred Years' War, 1337–1360
