= Siege of Tournai (1340) =

Siege during the Hundred Years' War

- Part of the Hundred Years' War
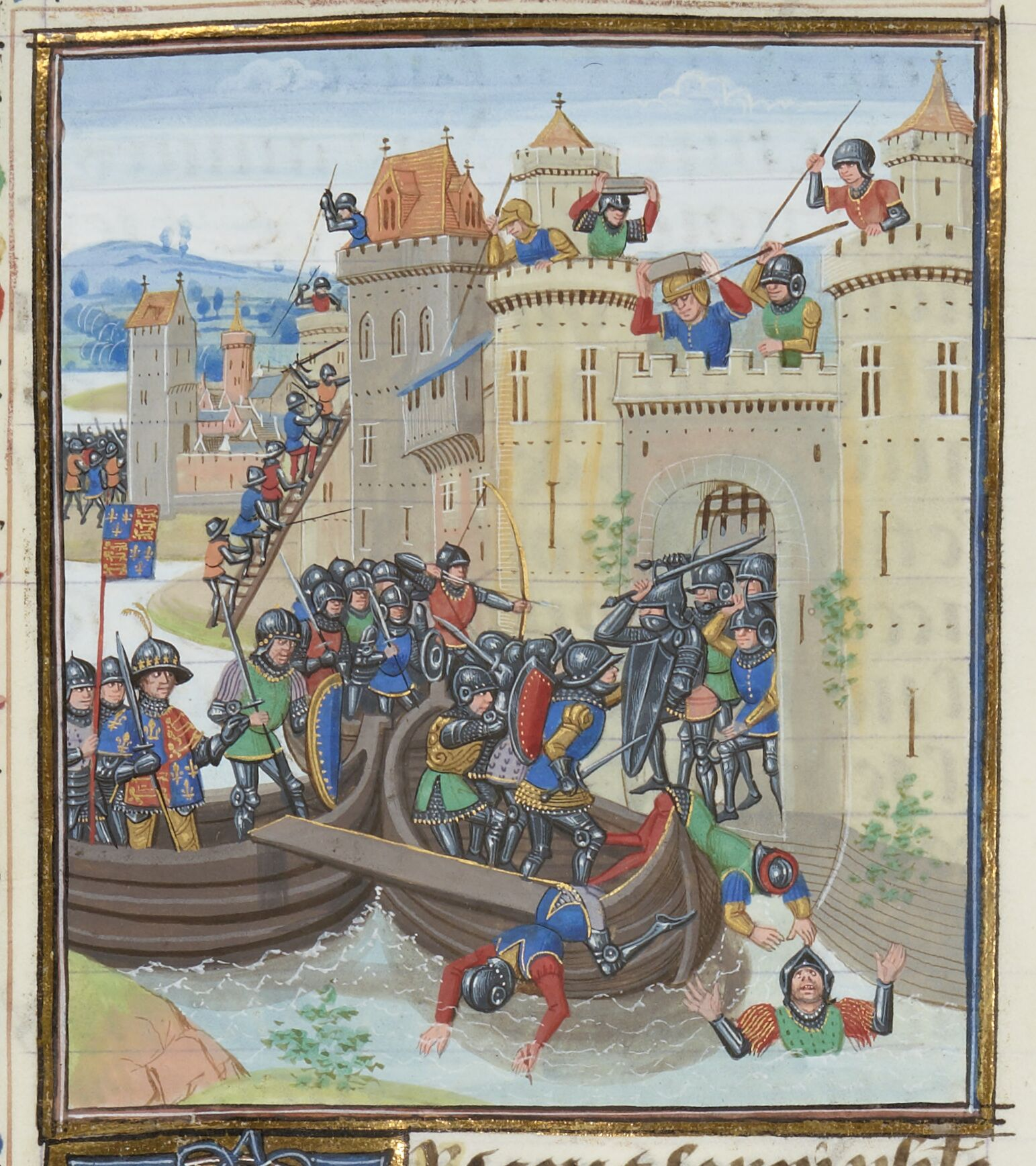
- Miniature of the siege from The Chronicle of St. Albans by Thomas Walsingham . 1460
Date	23 July – 25 September 1340
Location	Tournai, France 50°36′20″N 03°23′17″E
Result	inconclusive Truce of Espléchin

Belligerents
Kingdom of France	Kingdom of England; County of Flanders; Duchy of Brabant; County of Hainaut; Holy Roman Empire

Commanders and leaders
King Philip VI; Enguerrand VI de Coucy; Raoul I of Brienne, Count of Eu; Gaston II, Count of Foix	King Edward III; Jacob van Artevelde; John III; William II; John Chandos

Strength
5,800 • 2/3 men-at-arms • 1/3 foot soldiers	~23,000 men

Casualties and losses
Unknown	Unknown
- Location of Tournai in modern day Belgium

The siege of Tournai (23 July - 25 September 1340) occurred during the Edwardian phase of the Hundred Years' War. The siege began when a coalition of England, Flanders, Hainaut, Brabant and the Holy Roman Empire under the command of King Edward III of England besieged the French city of Tournai. This siege would end in the Truce of Espléchin, marking the end of the Tournaisis campaign of 1340.

== Background ==
Edward's crushing naval victory at the Battle of Sluys allowed him to land his army and carry out his campaign in northern France. When Edward landed he would be joined by Jacob van Artevelde, Flanders' semi-dictatorial ruler who had gained control of the County in an insurrection. By 1340 the cost of the war had already drained the English treasuries and Edward arrived in Flanders penniless. Edward had attempted to pay for his campaign through a large tax on grain and wool, however, this tax raised only £15,000 of the £100,000 predicted.

Shortly after landing Edward split his army. 10,000 to 15,000 Flemings and 1,000 English longbowmen would launch a chevauchée under the command of Robert III of Artois and the remainder of the coalition forces under Edward would go on to besiege Tournai.

== Siege ==
Apart from the inhabitants, Tournai also had a 5,800 man strong French garrison inside. This garrison was made up of the permanent garrison led by Constable of France, Raoul I and a 2500-3000 strong force commanded by Gaston II, the Count of Foix sent earlier by Philip.

The coalition reached Tournai on 23 July. Edward's forces were supported by Flemish militia led by Jacob van Artevelde, the armies of William II, the Count of Hainaut and the Holy Roman Empire sent by Louis IV. At the end of July, the survivors of the Battle of Saint-Omer arrived at Tournai and joined the siege. Later, these forces would be reinforced by the troops of John III, the Duke of Brabant.

Upon their arrival, the coalition surrounded the city and constructed siege engines. Among these siege engines were cannons. This makes the Siege of Tournai notable for being an early example of the use of the cannon in European siege warfare. These siege engines had little effect due to Tournai's modern walls and Edward soon decided to secure the city through famine. Tournai had little time to accumulate stores of food as the French had done before in the Siege of Cambrai and the massive size of its garrison made the city vulnerable to a protracted siege.

The besiegers quickly grew impatient and on 26 August 2,000 Flemings assaulted the walls. However, they were repulsed with heavy losses. On 2 September another attempt on the walls was made when a battering ram was brought to the gate. This attempt lasted most of the day but no progress was made and the attempt was broken off. These assaults worsened the animosity between the members of the coalition in part due to their lack of success and because the Germans and Brabantians didn't take part in them.

As the siege dragged on the financial position of Edward became more apparent. When September arrived and no money arrived from England, Edward had to go further into debt to feed his army. It was clear to him that the armies of the coalition would abandon him if they weren't paid. As Phillip drew closer the men of Brabant and Hainaut threatened to mutiny if they weren't paid. Edward knew that most of his army wouldn't fight and started seeking peace negotiations. On 22 September Edward's mother-in-law, Joan of Valois, visited him in his tent and begged for peace. She had already made the same plea to her brother, Philip. These negotiations would lead to the Truce of Espléchin on 25 September and Tournai was relieved.

== Aftermath ==
The Truce marked a complete failure for England in northern France. England's allies were unhappy with their lack of success and lack of pay and immediately disintegrated after the truce. Edward returned to England bankrupt, blaming the failure of the campaign on his ministers for failing to send him money. After returning to London on 30 November 1340 he purged the royal administration of a great number of ministers and judges. Among those purged were the Mayor of London, the chancellor Robert de Stratford, the treasurer and the financers William de la Pole and Richard de la Pole. This purge of ministers paralyzed the English government for the first four months of 1341. Also, in response to the failure suffered by the English under John Chandos, he reportedly sacked and burned nearby towns and smaller castles.

The truce also weakened the French crown. Flanders remained under the control of Jacob van Artevelde. This brought Flanders into England's sphere of influence. Louis I, Count of Flanders remained in exile until his death. The cost of war had also taken a great toll on France. Although France was not bankrupt, Philip had debased his currency five times between 1337 and 1340, reducing its nominal value by 60%. Many towns in northern France had also been destroyed by the English on campaign. Among them Aire, Arques, Orchies and Saint-Amand-les-Eaux.
