= Hundred Years' War, 1337–1360 =

First phase of the Hundred Years' War

Edwardian War (1337–1360)
- Part of the Hundred Years' War
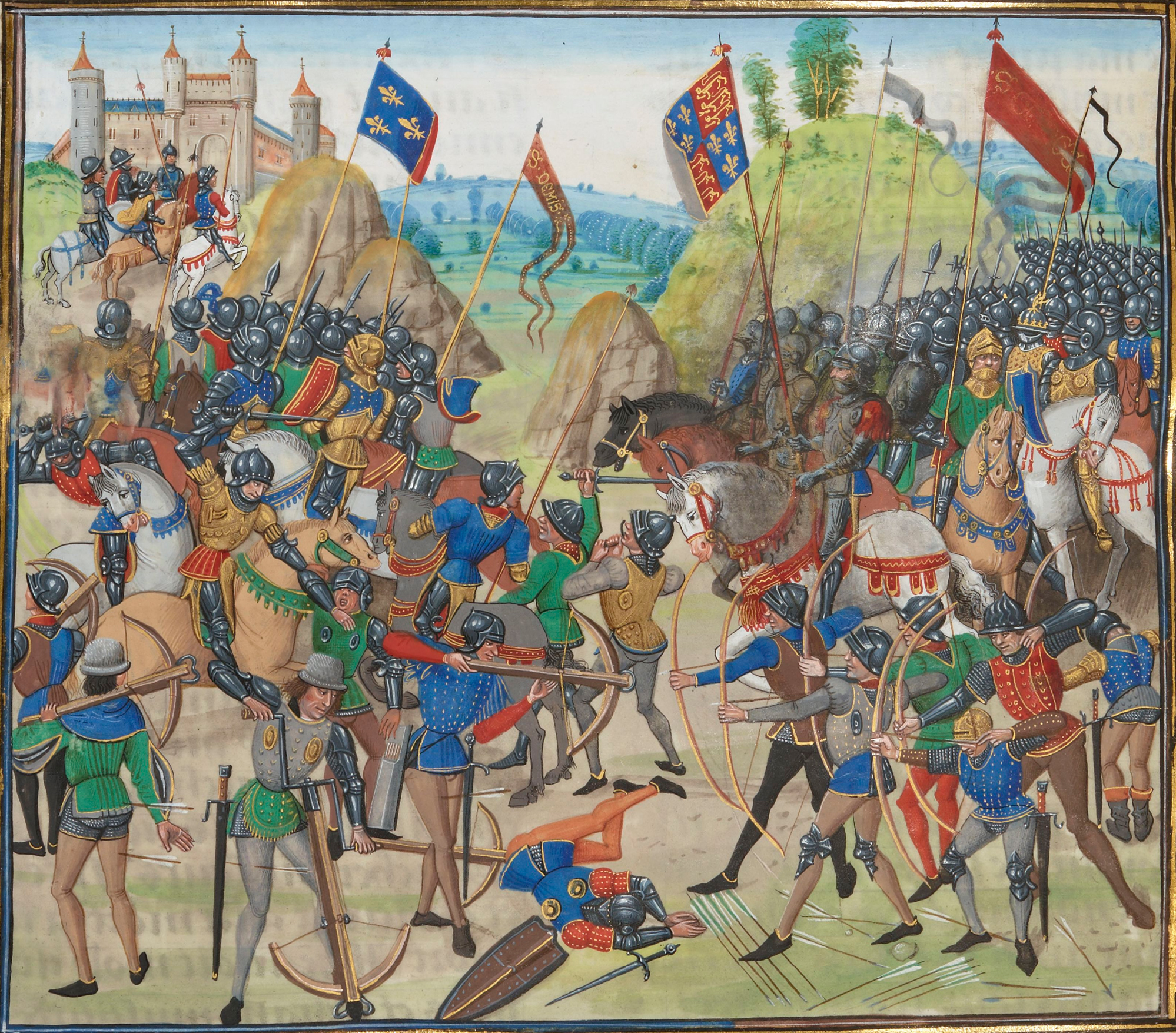
- The Battle of Crécy in 1346 (Jean Froissart's Chronicles)
Date	1337–1360
Location	France
Result	English victory: Treaty of Brétigny in 1360; War resumes in 1369

Belligerents
Kingdom of England: Principality of Wales; Duchy of Gascony; Duchy of Aquitaine; Duchy of Brittany; County of Flanders County of Hainaut	Kingdom of France; Kingdom of Scotland; Republic of Genoa^{(Genoese mercenaries)} Kingdom of Bohemia; Duchy of Lorraine; Kingdom of Majorca; Kingdom of Navarre Kingdom of Castile

Commanders and leaders
Edward III; The Black Prince; Earl of Northampton; Henry of Lancaster; Jean de Grailly; Earl of Warwick; Earl of Salisbury; Earl of Stafford; Sir John Chandos; Robert d'Artois #; Guy de Beauchamp; Ralph Neville; Henry Percy; Jacob van Artevelde	Philip VI #; John II (surrendered); Charles, Dauphin of France; Hugues Quiéret †; Raoul of Brienne (executed); Charles of Alençon †; Rudolph of Lorraine †; Louis of Châtillon †; Philip of Orléans; Charles de La Cerda; Antonio Doria; John the Blind †; David II (surrendered)

The Edwardian War of 1337 to 1360 was the first phase of the Hundred Years' War between England and France. It was initiated by King Edward III of England claiming the French throne in defiance of King Philip VI of France. The dynastic conflict was caused by disputes over the French feudal sovereignty over Aquitaine and the English claims over the French royal title. The Kingdom of England and its allies dominated this phase of the war, and Edward's sovereignty over Aquitaine was confirmed in the Treaty of Brétigny (1360), although he renounced his claim to the French throne.

Edward had been granted the duchy of Aquitaine in 1325, and as Duke of Aquitaine he was a vassal to Philip VI of France. Due to political trouble in England during his early reign as a minor, Edward initially accepted Philip as King of France, but the relationship between the two kings soured in the 1330s when Philip allied with Edward's enemy, King David II of Scotland. Edward in turn provided refuge to Robert III of Artois, a French fugitive. When Edward refused to obey Philip's demands for the expulsion of Robert from England, Philip confiscated the Duchy of Aquitaine. This precipitated war and, in 1340, Edward declared himself king of France. Edward III and his son Edward the Black Prince, led their armies on a largely successful campaign across France with notable victories at Auberoche (1345), Crécy (1346), Calais (1347), and La Roche-Derrien (1347). Hostilities were paused until the mid-1350s for the deprivations of the Black Death. Then war continued, and the English were victorious at the Battle of Poitiers (1356) where the French king, John II, was captured and held for ransom. The Truce of Bordeaux was signed in 1357 and was followed by two treaties in London in 1358 and 1359.

After the treaties of London failed, Edward launched the Rheims campaign, which, though largely unsuccessful, led to the Treaty of Brétigny, which settled certain lands in France on Edward for renouncing his claim to the French throne. This was in part caused by Black Monday (1360), a freak hailstorm that devastated the English army and forced Edward III into peace talks. This peace lasted nine years before a second phase of hostilities known as the Caroline War began.

== Background ==
Family tree showing the background to the French succession crisis

Edward II, King of England, was deposed in 1327, and succeeded by his son Edward III. When Charles IV, King of France, died in 1328, the nearest male in line to the French throne was Edward III. The latter inherited his right to the throne from his mother, Isabella of France, who was the sister of Charles IV. The question arose of whether she could transmit a right that she, as a woman, did not possess, as only men could legally be the French monarch. An assembly of the French aristocracy was held to settle the manner. They decided that Charles IV's first cousin, Philip, Count of Valois, should be crowned king as Philip VI, as he was the nearest heir through male ancestry. The establishment of a legal succession to the French throne was central to the subsequent war, and Edward III and succeeding generations of English monarchs laid claim to the throne.

After some initial reluctance, in 1329, 17-year-old Edward III, in his capacity as Duke of Aquitaine, paid homage to Philip VI. Gascony, which had been incorporated into Aquitaine, was located in southwest France, just north of the Pyrenees mountains. The Gascons had their own language and customs. A large proportion of the red wine (known as claret) that they produced, was shipped in a profitable trade with the English. The trade provided the English king with significant revenue. The Gascons preferred their relationship with a distant English king who left them alone, to a French king who might interfere in their affairs.

Despite Edward's homage to Philip the French continued to interfere in Gascony. There had been a series of skirmishes at some of the walled towns along the Gascon border. Agenais was an area of Gascony in French hands, and the officials there put pressure on the English administration. A chain of religious houses, although in Edward's jurisdiction, had cases held by French officials. Philip also contracted with various lords within Gascony to provide troops in the event of war with England.

Gascony was not the only issue; in the 1330s, France's support for Scotland caused problems for the English. Loyalties in the Low Countries were split. In Flanders, the towns were dependent on supplies of English wool, whereas the aristocracy supported the French king. Another element was that of naval power. Philip had intended to go on a crusade and had assembled a fleet off Marseille. These plans were abandoned in 1336, and the fleet moved to the English Channel off Normandy in an obvious act of provocation against the English. One of Edward's influential advisers was Robert III of Artois. Robert was an exile from the French court, having fallen out with Philip VI over an inheritance claim. In November 1336, Philip issued an ultimatum to the seneschal of Gascony threatening that if Robert was not extradited to France then great peril and dissension would follow. When Philip confiscated the English king's lands in Gascony and the county of Ponthieu the following year, he laid emphasis on the case of Robert as one of the contributing causes.

== (1337–1341) ==
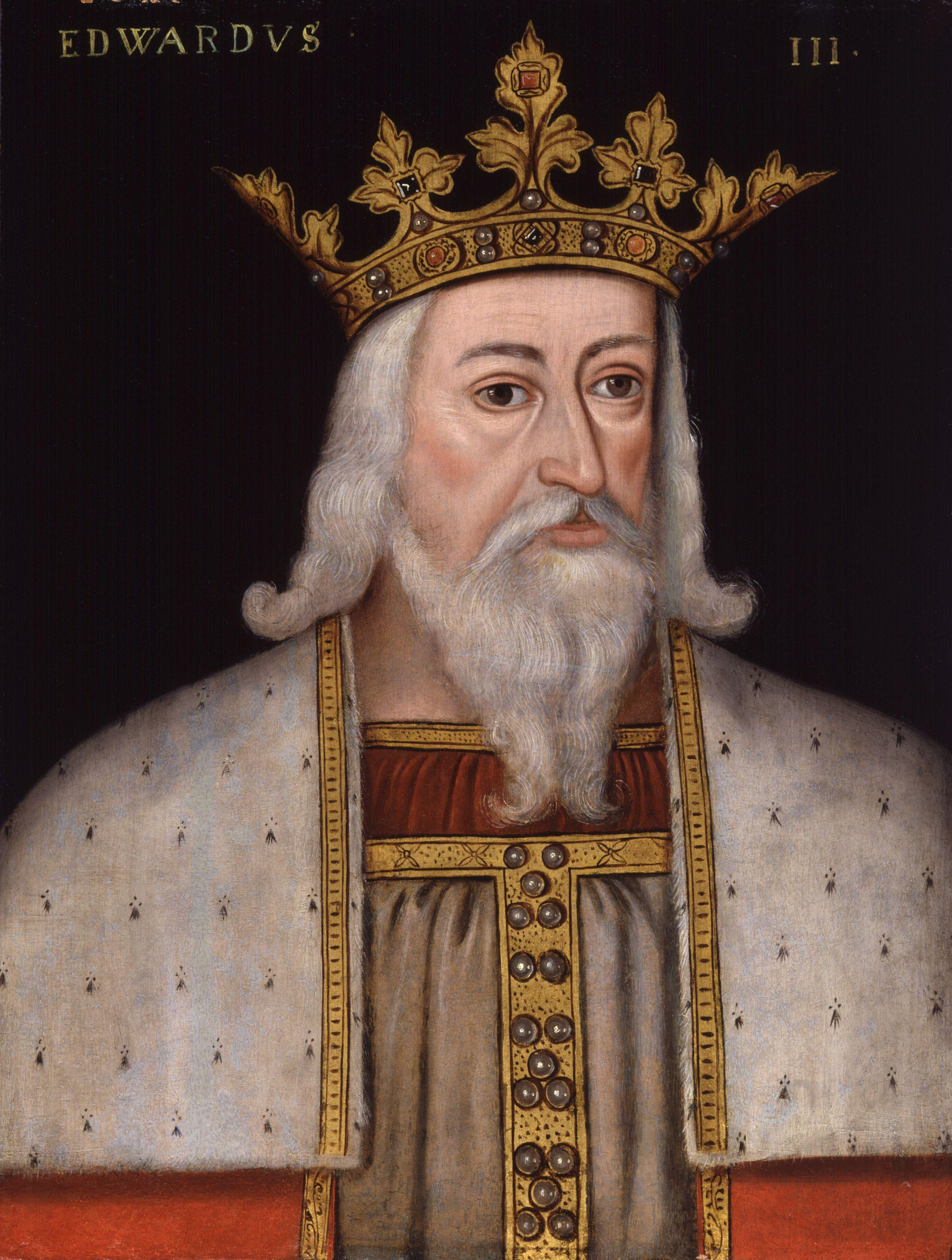
16th-century portrait of Edward III of England

The confiscation of Gascony by Philip VI precipitated the war in 1337. In response, Edward's strategy was for the English in Gascony to hold their position while his army would invade France from the north. The English forces would be supplemented by a grand alliance of continental supporters whom he promised payment of over £200,000, valued at £65,000,000 in 2018. To pay for the war Edward had to raise large amounts of money for his own forces and also his allies on the continent. It was unlikely that the English parliament would grant the requisite sums quickly, so, in the summer of 1337, William de la Pole developed a plan to make virtually all of the nation's wool stock available to help finance the war, 30,000 sacks would be sold by the English merchants, and the sum (estimated at £200,000) would be lent to Edward. To pay the fees promised to his allies, Edward was also forced to borrow heavily from the great banking houses of Bardi and Peruzzi. Late in 1338, when he had exhausted the funds from the banking houses, William de la Pole, came again to the king's rescue by advancing him £110,000. Much of the money that de la Pole lent was raised from other English merchants. Edward also borrowed money from merchants in the Low Countries, who charged extortionate rates of interest and demanded more solid guarantees of repayment. In 1340 the Earls of Derby and Northampton were held as surety for the repayment of loans. In the summer of 1339, Edward had asked the Commons for a grant of £300,000. In early 1340 they offered the grant in return for concessions from the king. Edward, delayed by his money-raising efforts, was temporarily unable to proceed with his invasion plans.

Meanwhile, the delay in invasion meant that the French government could use its resources elsewhere. In December 1338, Gascony was invaded by the French, who took Saint-Macaire and Blaye. The Englishman charged with the defense of Gascony was the seneschal of Gascony, Oliver Ingham, who had been in and out of favour with Edward III and his father Edward II. He had proved himself to be an able soldier being a "remarkable improviser". As the English strategy was to invade France from the north, Ingham received neither troops nor funds from England, but had to rely entirely on local resources. These were very scarce, so ultimately his strategy was for the English to wall themselves up in their castles and hold on as best they could. He was able to persuade the lord of Albret to switch sides from the French in 1339 and with his help conduct a raid into French territory.

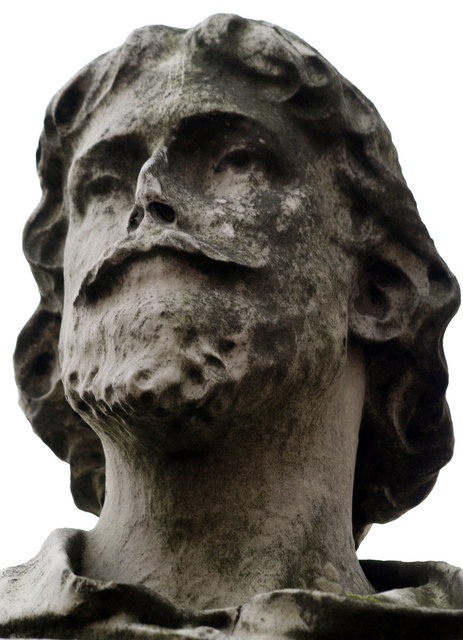
Statue of Edward III's moneylender William de la Pole

The English parliament, in February 1339, had called up ships from the various ports around the English coast to provide for two naval fleets. This had not happened so the French who had hired galleys and crews from Genoa were able to strike almost at will upon the English coast. Portsmouth was raided, Southampton sacked, and Guernsey captured. The French campaign at sea continued in July 1339 when the French fleet set sail for the south coast of England where they intended a great raid on the Cinque Ports. Their first objective was Sandwich, in Kent. However, the Kent levies were waiting for them in force along the coast so the fleet continued onto Rye where they landed some men and proceeded to raid the area. However, the English had finally put together two fleets and both of them under Robert Morley arrived to confront the French. The French, with their Italian mercenaries believing that the English fleet was larger than it actually was, re-embarked in their ships and headed for the French coast. They escaped into the harbors without there being a naval engagement. In August, the French naval campaign came to an abrupt end when, after quarrelling over pay, the Genoese crews mutinied and taking over their galleys they returned to Italy.

Apart from a few notable exceptions, such as unwalled Hastings, which was burnt to the ground, the English coastal defenses had been fairly successful against the French raiding. However, with many English going to France at the beginning of the war and others being used to defend the coast against the French, the available troops in the north and Scotland was diminished. With the English presence reduced, the Scots were able to recapture many strong points, such as Perth in 1339 and Edinburgh in 1341.

Threatened with the immediate collapse of his plans, Edward desperately needed some positive military results. In September, Edward assembled an army consisting of about 12,000 men in the Low Countries. His army included elements from his various allies. Cambrai was an ally of the king of France, so, on 20 September, Edward's army marched into the bishopric. A two-week siege of Cambrai ensued. The whole area was laid waste but Cambrai was not taken, then on the evening of 9 October, Edward's army gave up and advanced into France proper. While Edward had been besieging Cambrai, the French king had time to call up his army. On Edward's invasion, the French army advanced to Péronne, close to the border. While Edward's army laid waste to a twenty-mile-wide strip of French countryside, plundering and burning hundreds of villages, Philip's army shadowed Edward's army. On 14 October, Edward advanced toward the French army and battle appeared imminent. Edward moved away again plundering more territory. The French continued to shadow the English. Ultimately battle lines were drawn in the province of Picardy between La Capelle and La Flamengrie, both now in the Vervins arrondissement just inside northern France. With both sides facing each other a battle was expected to take place on 23 October, but nothing happened. At nightfall Edward marched his troops out of France, the French did not pursue Edward, this resulted in the campaign coming to an abrupt end.

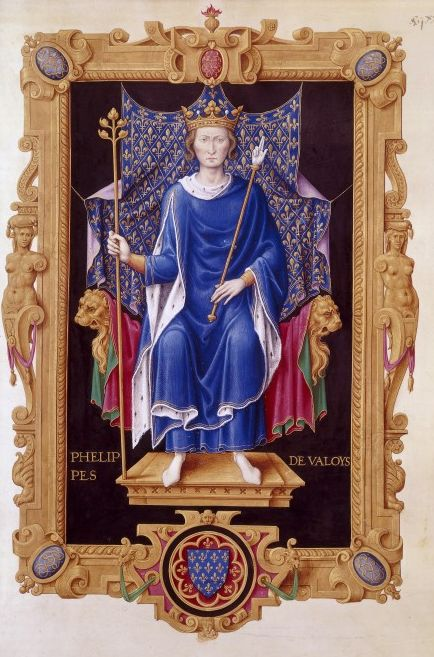
Philip VI of France

The Flemish ruler had remained loyal to the French king, consequently, Edward placed an embargo on all English goods to Flanders. In 1337, this precipitated a revolt in Flanders, because of the lack of English wool and food supplies. The leader of the revolt Jacob van Artevelde arranged for Flemish neutrality, in return for the lifting of the English embargo. By December, the Flemings were ready to formally join the anti-French coalition. The civic authorities of Ghent, Ypres, and Bruges proclaimed Edward King of France. Edward's purpose was to strengthen his alliances with the Low Countries. His supporters would be able to claim that they were loyal to the "true" king of France and not rebels against Philip. In February 1340, Edward returned to England to try and raise more funds and also deal with political difficulties.

English defenses in Gascony had been severely strained for some time, relief came when two of the nobles who supported the French king pursued a family feud against each other rather than fighting the English. The two nobles involved were the Count of Armagnac and the Count of Foix. Also, further assistance was provided by the Albret family, with Bernard-Aiz, Lord of Albret declaring for Edward in 1339. The Albrets held one of the most important lordships in English Gascony and had been courted by both the English and French crowns. Albret financed Edward's campaign in Gascony and also with his family connections was able to find much-needed additional manpower for Edward's army.

In 1340, the French put together an invasion fleet containing French, Castilian, and Genoese ships. The 400 or so ships were squeezed into the Zwyn estuary. The English had no purpose-built warships, so had to make do with deep-draught, round-hulled merchant ships, known as cogs, that were converted for naval duties. Edward assembled a combined fleet at Orwell, in Kent and set up his headquarters on the cog Thomas. Although he knew that the French fleet was a far superior force to his own he sailed with his fleet on 22 June to confront the French fleet a day later. The French fleet assumed a defensive formation off the port of Sluys, possibly trying to prevent Edward from landing his army. The English fleet apparently tricked the French into believing they were withdrawing. However, when the wind turned in the late afternoon, the English attacked with the wind and sun behind them. Edward sent his ships against the French fleet in units of three, two ships crammed with archers and one full of men-at-arms. Because the ships of the French fleet were so close together it limited their maneuverability. The English ships with the archers would come alongside a French ship and rain arrows down on its decks, the men-at-arms would then just mop up. The French fleet was almost completely destroyed in what became known as the Battle of Sluys. England dominated the English Channel for the rest of the war, preventing French invasions.

In spring of 1340, Philip VI had planned to smash the anti-French coalition by attacking Edward III's allies. French forces invaded Hainaut in May. But when news reached him about the disaster at Sluys, he turned his attention to counter the new threat. Edward III split his army in two. The first, led by Robert of Artois invaded the province of Artois. But in a battle with the garrison of Saint-Omer 26 June, most of this army was destroyed, and Robert was forced to retreat. On the same day Edward III appeared before the walls of Tournai. (Although these days it is in Belgium, then it was one of France's largest cities.) The siege dragged out, and in September, Philip VI arrived with the main French army. Philip VI again refused to meet the English in battle. Both sides running out of money led to a temporary truce (Truce of Espléchin, 25 September 1340).

The Truce of Espléchin marked the end of the first phase of the Hundred Years' War and resulted in a cessation of hostilities on all fronts for nine months. The cost both politically and financially had been immense. Grand alliances could no longer be afforded and some allies could no longer be relied on. The German princes all backed out of the anti-French alliance, only the burghers of Flanders remained. In England; opinion was turning against Edward, his gains on the continent had been at a large cost and most of Scotland had been lost. Essentially bankrupt, Edward was forced to cut his losses. Those whose support he could not afford to lose were repaid, others were not. The contemporary Florentine chronicler Giovanni Villani suggested that the banks of Bardi and Peruzzi failed because Edward III defaulted on the loans. Villani was not an independent source, his brother was a member of the Peruzzi company. Villani said that Edward owed the Bardi 900,000 gold florins (£135,000) and the Peruzzi 600,000 (£90,000). But the Peruzzis' records show that they never had that much capital to lend Edward III. In reality, the English crown had forced the companies to accept a smaller amount of debt and repaid some with cash and others with royal grants of wool, a principal export of the English economy at the time.

Further, at the same time Florence was going through a period of internal disputes and the third largest financial company, the Acciaiuoli, also went bankrupt, and they did not lend any money to Edward. What loans Edward III did default on are likely only to have contributed to the financial problems in Florence, not caused them.

== Brittany (1341–1345) ==
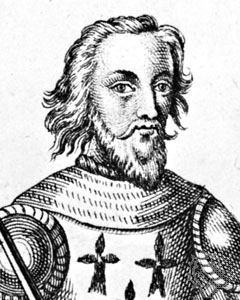
Charles of Blois

On 30 April 1341, Duke John III of Brittany died without heirs precipitating the Breton war of succession. Although John III died childless, he did leave two candidates for the dukedom; his younger half-brother John of Montfort and his niece Joan of Penthièvre, daughter of his brother Guy. Jeanne of Penthièvre's was more closely related to John III than John of Montfort however, the new rules on female inheritance, that had excluded Edward III to the throne of France, seemed to imply that women could not succeed to powerful titles. Jeanne of Penthièvre's husband was the King's nephew, Charles of Blois. According to feudal law, it was the king of France's responsibility to decide who should inherit. Unwilling to rely on the King's impartiality, John of Montfort assumed the title, seized Nantes, the Breton capital, and summoned the knight-service of Brittany to recognize him as Duke of Montfort. The French-speaking magnates and bishops refused to recognize John of Montfort although the minor clergy, the knights and the Breton peasantry did, the result was a civil war.

After capturing Nantes, John of Montfort went on to seize the ducal treasury at Limoges and, by the middle of August, he was in possession of most of the duchy, including the three principal cities, Nantes, Rennes and Vannes. Philip of France favoured Charles of Blois as the official candidate. So fearing that the French army would depose him, John of Montfort fled to England to seek the support of Edward III.

Despite the Truce of Espléchin still being in place, Edward III agreed to provide help. John of Montfort returned to Brittany and waited for confirmation of this assistance from the English Parliament. Meanwhile, Philip VI sent a large army to Brittany in support of Charles of Blois and by November they had trapped John of Montfort in Nantes. With the possibility of a long siege, the citizens of Nantes decided to surrender John of Montfort to the French army. He was then imprisoned in Paris.

It now fell upon John's wife, Joanna of Flanders, to lead the Montfortist cause. She set up headquarters at Hennebont in southern Brittany, and defended it against Charles de Blois' army throughout the winter of 1341–42. Her forces managed to keep the road open between the port of Brest and Hennebont, which enabled a small English force to land at Brest and combine with her forces to drive the French army away and recapture territory in the west of Brittany.

In August 1342, another English force under the command of the Earl of Northampton, arrived and landed at the port of Brest. The force advanced across Brittany and captured Vannes. The English forces with contingents commanded by Richard de Artois defeated a French army under Charles of Blois near Morlaix on 30 September 1342. Robert de Artois sailed to England where he died of wounds received at the taking of Vannes. Worse still for Edward III, Vannes was retaken by a French force under the command of Olivier IV de Clisson.

== Truce of Malestroit and aftermath (1343–1345) ==
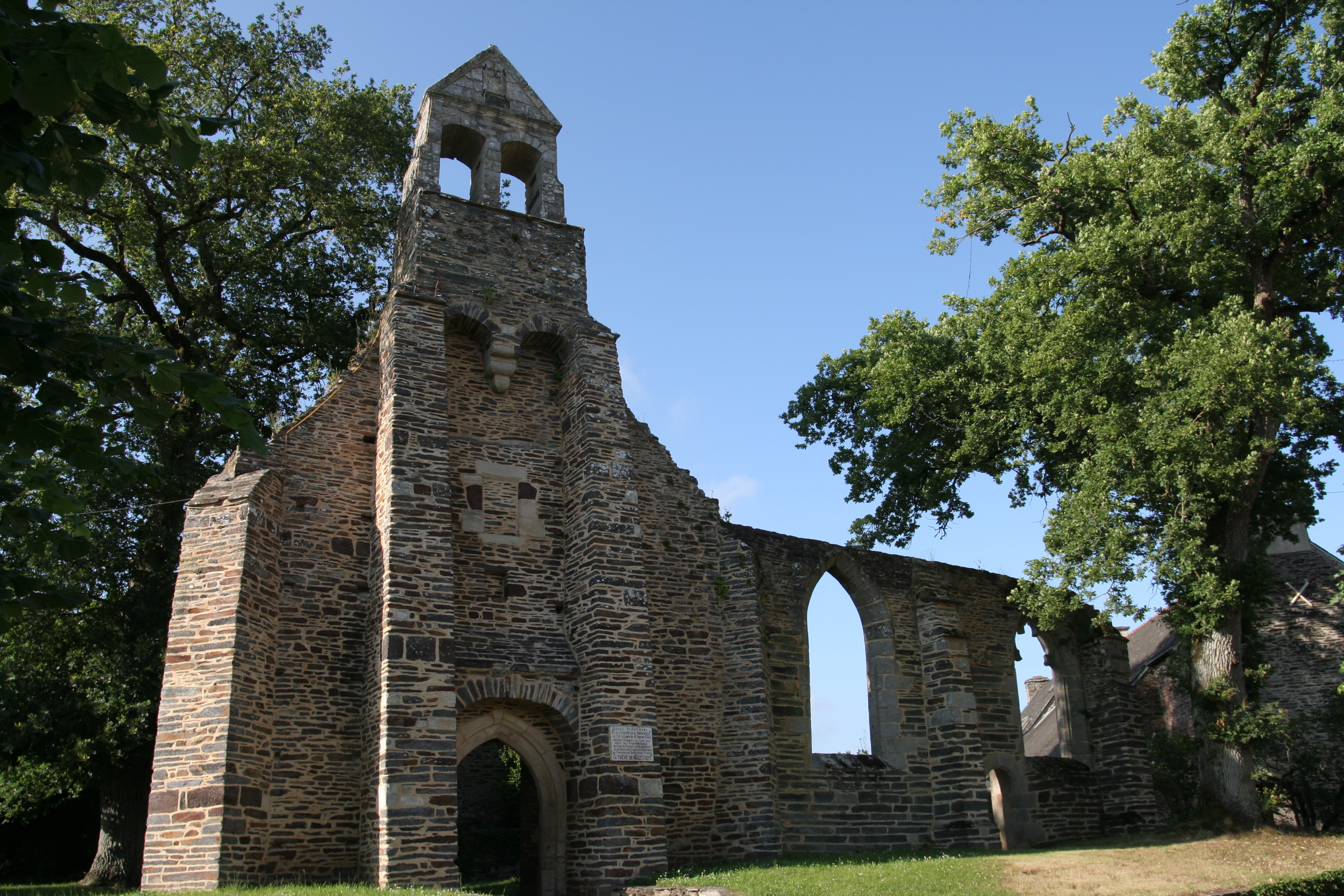
The ruins of the Chapel of the Madeleine, Malestroit (in 2013), where the Truce of Malestroit was sealed

In late October 1342, Edward III arrived with his main army at Brest, and retook Vannes. He then moved east to besiege Rennes. A French army marched to engage him, but a major battle was averted when two cardinals arrived from Avignon in January 1343 and enforced a general truce, the Truce of Malestroit. Even with the truce in place, the war continued in Brittany until May 1345 when Edward eventually succeeded in taking control.

The official reason for such a long truce was to allow time for a peace conference and the negotiation of a lasting peace, but both countries also suffered from war exhaustion. In England, the tax burden had been heavy, and in addition, the wool trade had been heavily manipulated. Edward III spent the next years slowly paying off his immense debt.

In France, Philip VI had financial difficulties of his own. France had no central institution with the authority to grant taxes for the whole country. Instead, the Crown had to negotiate with the various provincial assemblies. In accordance with the ancient feudal customs, most of them refused to pay taxes while there was a truce. Instead, Philip VI had to resort to manipulation of the coinage and he introduced two vastly unpopular taxes, first the 'fouage', or hearth tax, and then the 'gabelle', a tax on salt.

In 1343, the Seneschal of Gascony Oliver Ingham was recalled to England and replaced with Nicholas de la Beche. Beche upheld the Truce of Malestroit in the duchy as best he could. No major campaigns were fought, between February 1343 and June 1345 but he failed to restore the civil peace and he went about himself with an escort of forty men at arms, his predecessor only had half that number.

When there was a treaty or truce in place it left many a soldier unemployed, so rather than go back to a life of poverty they would band together in free companies or routiers. The routier companies consisted of men who principally came from Gascony but also from Brittany and other parts of France, Spain, Germany, and England. They would use their military training to live off the countryside robbing, looting, killing or torturing as they went to get supplies. With the Malestroit truce in force, bands of routiers became an increasing problem. They were well-organised and would sometimes act as mercenaries for one or both sides. One tactic would be to seize a town or castle of local strategic importance. From this base, they would plunder the surrounding areas until nothing of value remained, and then move on to places more ripe. Often they would hold towns to ransom who would pay them to go away. The routier problem was not solved until a system of taxation in the 15th century allowed for a regular army that employed the best of the routiers.

== English victories (1345–1351) ==
On 5 July 1346, Edward set sail from Portsmouth with about 750 ships and 7,000–10,000 men, beginning a major invasion across the Channel. With him was his nearly 16-year-old son, Edward, the Black Prince (Edward of Woodstock), the recently created Prince of Wales. On 12 July, Edward landed at Hague in the Cotentin peninsula of Normandy. Jean Froissart wrote in his Chronicles that:

When the king of England arrived in the Hogue Saint-Vaast, the king issued out of his ship, and the first foot that he set on the ground, he fell so rudely, that [he had a nosebleed]. The knights that were about him took him up and said: "Sir, for God's sake enter again into your ship, and come not aland this day, for this is but an evil sign for us." Then the king answered quickly and said: "Wherefore? [Why?] This is a good token for me, for the land desireth to have me.' Of the which answer all his men were right joyful. So that day and night the king lodged on the sands, and in the meantime discharged the ships of their horses and other baggages: there the king made two marshals of his host, the one the lord Geoffroy de Harcourt and the other the Earl of Warwick, and the Earl of Arundel. And he ordained that the Earl of Huntingdon should keep the fleet of ships with a hundred men of arms and four hundred archers: and also he ordained three [battalions], one to go on his right hand, closing to the sea-side, and the other on his left hand, and the king himself in the midst, and every night to lodge all in one field.

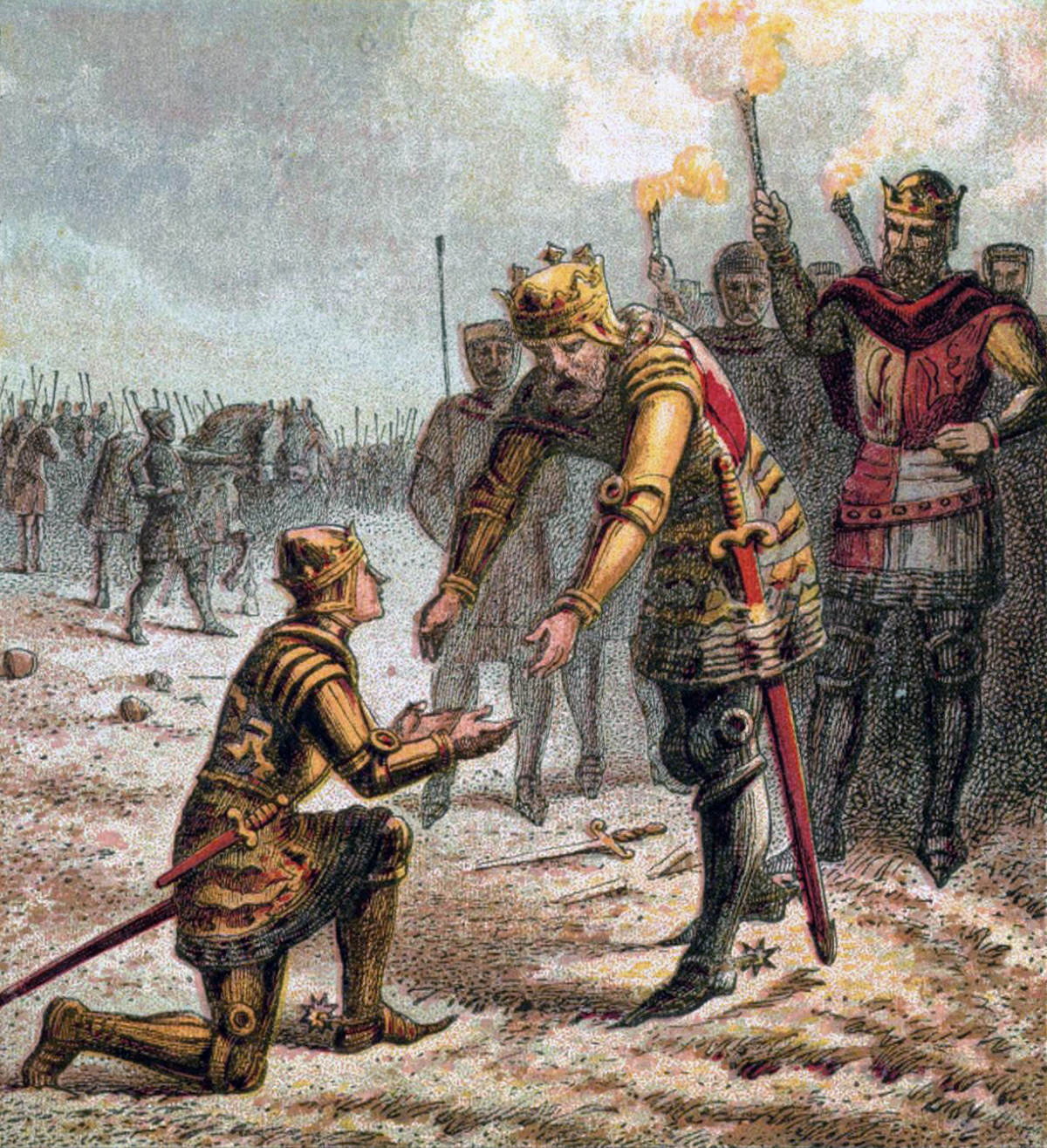
Depiction of Edward III and his son Edward the Black Prince, following the Battle of Crécy

The army marched through Normandy. Philip gathered a large army to oppose him, and Edward chose to march northward toward the Low Countries, pillaging as he went, rather than attempt to take and hold territory. During this time, he fought two successful actions, the Storming of Caen and the Battle of Blanchetaque. Eventually finding himself unable to outmanoeuvre Philip, Edward positioned his forces for battle, and Philip's army attacked him at the famous Battle of Crécy. The much larger French army made a series of piecemeal attacks against the expert English and Welsh longbowmen, and all of the attacks were dispersed with heavy losses until the French were forced to retreat. Crécy was a crushing defeat for the French.

Edward proceeded north unopposed and besieged the coastal city of Calais on the English Channel, capturing it in 1347. An English victory against Scotland in the Battle of Neville's Cross led to the capture of David II and greatly reduced the threat from Scotland.

In 1348, the Black Death began to sweep across Europe and in both England and France it would have huge consequences. This prevented England from financing and launching any major offensives. In France, Philip VI died in 1350 and was replaced by his son John II.

At that time there was bitter feeling between the English and the Spanish on account of various acts of violence and plunder which the Spaniards had committed against English ships at sea. In 1350, while the Spanish were in Flanders for trading purposes, they were told that the English were intending to waylay them on their voyage back home. They equipped their ships, lying at Sluys, with all kinds of weapons and powerful artillery, and engaged all the mercenaries, archers, and crossbowmen who were willing to serve them for pay. When Edward heard of these warlike preparations, he said angrily:

We have had long experience of Spanish ways. They have done us many wrongs and, far from making amends, they go on arming themselves against us. They must be intercepted on their way back.

The Spaniard's fleet followed a course along the south coast of England, hoping to descend on some unsuspecting town. They were interrupted by Edward's fleet off Winchelsea on the afternoon of 29 August 1350. The battle lasted until dusk and was a small-scale repeat of Sluys, with the archers slaughtering the Spanish seamen before the men-at-arms boarded their vessels. Nearly half the Spanish ships were captured, the rest escaping under cover of darkness.

== Collapse of the French government (1351–1360) ==
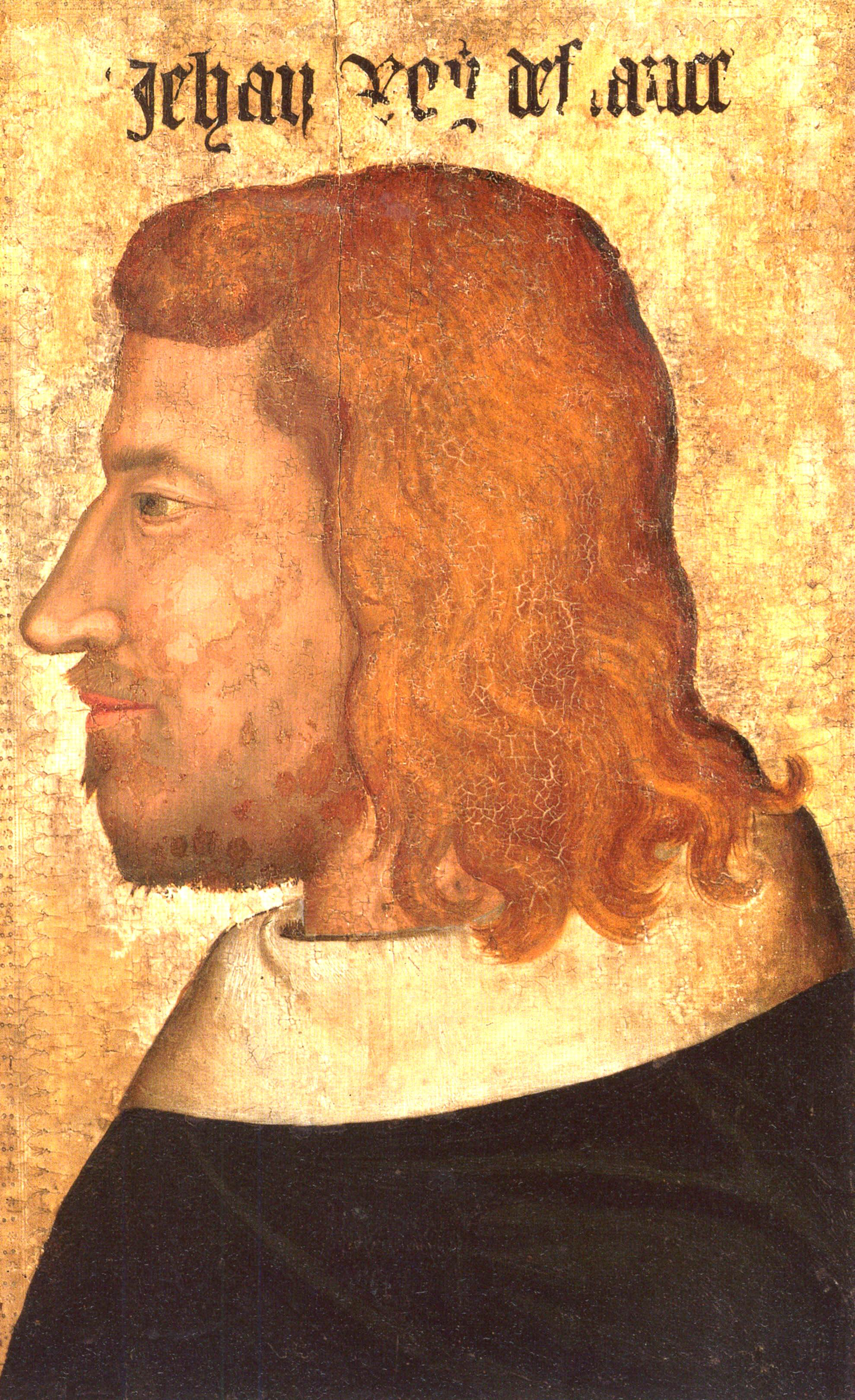
John II of France

Sporadic conflicts in Brittany continued, including notable incidents of chivalry such as the Combat of the Thirty in 1351. The battle was in fact a staged tournament. There had been a truce in place since 1347, so there was not supposed to be any fighting. Two of the opposing leaders, the Breton, Robert de Beaumanoir who held the garrison at Josselin, and the Englishman, Richmond Bambro who held the garrison at Ploërmel, agreed to stage a private fight with 30 knights from either side fighting with sharpened weapons. Among Bambro's knights were two famous men-at-arms, Robert Knolles and Hugh Calveley, but he could not find thirty Englishmen so had to make up the numbers with German men-at-arms. The battle raged all day and ended with a French victory. In keeping with chivalric tradition, the French ransomed many of the defeated English.

=== Chevauchée ===
The Black Death had reached England in 1348. The widespread effects of the plague had effectively put the war on hold. However, by the mid-1350s the disease had receded sufficiently to allow the country to start rebuilding its finances. So in 1355 Edward's son, Edward the Black Prince, resumed the war and invaded France from English-held Gascony and by August of that year he had begun a brutal campaign of raids known as chevauchée. This campaign was designed to terrorise and demoralise the people, discredit their leaders and drain the French king's financial resources. Anything that was portable was looted and anything that could not be taken away was broken or burnt. An observer at the time said, of the Black Prince, that "as he rode to Toulouse there was no town that he did not lay waste".

In August 1356, the Black Prince was threatened by a larger army under John II. The English attempted to retreat but their way was blocked at Poitiers. The Black Prince tried to negotiate terms with the French, but John's army attacked the English on 19 September 1356. The English archers were able to bring down the first three assaults of the French cavalry. At the point when the English archers were running out of arrows and many were wounded or exhausted, the French king deployed his reserves, an elite force of men. It seemed that the French would win the day, however, the Gascon noble Captal de Buch managed to thwart the French by leading a flanking maneuver, with a small group of men, that succeeded in capturing John II, and many of his nobles. John signed a truce with Edward III, and in his absence much of the government began to collapse. John's ransom was set to two million, but John believed he was worth more than that and insisted that his ransom be raised to four million écus.

The First Treaty of London was signed in 1358 and, essentially, was an agreement setting the ransom for John at four million écus. The first instalment was to be paid by 1 November 1358, however, the French defaulted on the agreement. The Second Treaty of London was signed on 12 March 1359 and this time the treaty allowed for hostages to be held in place of John. The hostages included two of his sons, several princes and nobles, four inhabitants of Paris, and two citizens from each of the nineteen principal towns of France. While these hostages were held, John returned to France to try and raise funds to pay the ransom. Also, under the terms of the treaty England gained possession of Normandy, Brittany, Anjou, Maine and all the coastline from Flanders to Spain, thus restoring the former Angevin Empire. The hostages were held in honourable captivity which under the chivalric code meant they were given free rein to move about. In 1362 John's son, Louis of Anjou, a hostage in English-held Calais, escaped his parole and refused to return. When John found out, ashamed at the actions of his son he felt duty-bound to return to captivity. He left Paris and gave himself up to the Captain of Calais, who returned him to his honourable captivity in England. He spent the rest of his reign there and died in London on 8 April 1364. John's funeral, in England, was a chivalrous affair and he was honoured as a great man by the Plantagenets.

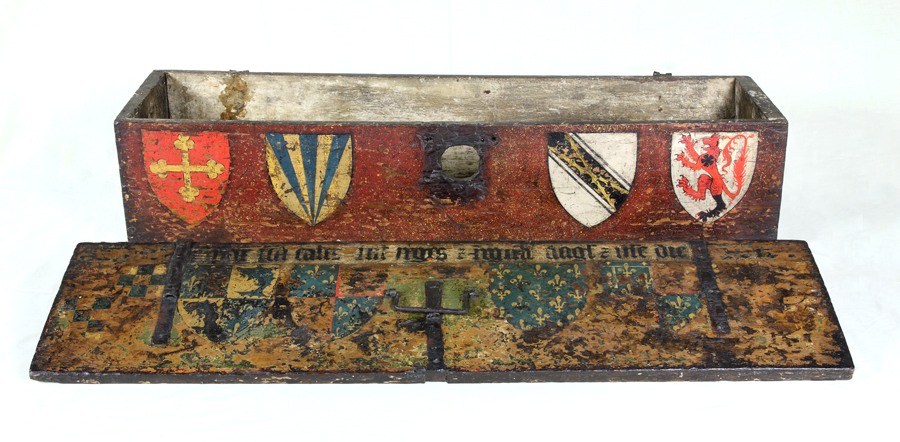
Chest that contained the ratified Treaty of Brétigny.

In 1358, a peasant revolt in France called the Jacquerie took place. It was caused by the deprivations suffered by the country people during the war and their treatment at the hands of the free companies and the French nobility, in particular, after the Battle of Poitiers. Led by Guillaume Kale, they joined forces with other villages, and beginning in the area of Beauvais, north of Paris, committed atrocities against the nobles and destroyed many chateaux in the area. All the rebellious groups were defeated later that summer at the battle of Mello and reprisals followed.

Capitalising on the discontent in France, Edward assembled his army at Calais in the late summer of 1359. His first objective was to take the city of Rheims. However, the citizens of Reims built and reinforced the city's defences before Edward and his army arrived. Edward besieged Rheims for five weeks but the new fortifications held out. He lifted the siege and moved his army on to Paris in the spring of 1360. The suburbs of Paris were sacked but the city held out. His army was weakened from being harassed by the French companies and also disease, so after a few skirmishes Edward moved his army to the town of Chartres. At Chartres, disaster struck when a freak hailstorm devastated Edward's army, killing an estimated 1,000 English soldiers and 6,000 horses. Following this phenomenon, the King underwent a religious period where he vowed to God to make peace with France. When the Dauphin offered negotiations he was ready to agree. Representatives of the two crowns met at Brétigny and within a week they had agreed to a draft treaty. The Treaty of Brétigny was later ratified by the two Kings John and Edward as the Treaty of Calais on 24 October 1360. Under the terms of the treaty, Edward agreed to renounce the French crown. In return, he obtained full sovereign rights over an expanded Aquitaine and Calais.

== See also ==
- The Vows of the Heron
