= Truce of Espléchin =

1340 truce during Hundred Years' War

The Truce of Espléchin (1340) was a truce between the English and French crowns during the early phases of the Hundred Years' War.

== Background ==
The Hundred Years' War had started in 1337. After a naval defeat at the hands of the French at the Battle of Arnemuiden in 1338, Edward III of England, allied with the Flemings, decided to pursue the naval campaign and encountered a large French and Genoese fleet at Sluys. The English won the resulting naval battle, which took place on 24 June 1340. The English navy was ably assisted by their allies, principally Flemings from Sluys and nearby Bruges who watched the fight from the shore and kept any French sailors from escaping.

At the battle of Sluys the dispatched French naval force was almost completely destroyed. Edward III attempted to capitalize on the victory with a Battle of Saint-Omer, which resulted in a resounding defeat for the 11–16,000 strong English and Flemings army at the hands of some 3000 French men-at-arms. The subsequent siege of the town of Tournai, equally ended in a failure for the Anglo-Flemish besiegers, despite all their attempts to dislodge a heavily outnumbered and outsupplied French garrison. Edward had been well aware of his enemy's precarious position as a French messenger had been intercepted.

== The truce ==
Following major setbacks at Saint-Omer and Tournai, Edward's ability to continue the siege and campaign in France came to an abrupt end. The defeats sustained by the Anglo-Flemish armies resulted in bickering within his alliance but also in his own parliament withholding much-needed funds to enable him to continue the war.

Pope Benedict XII had asked Edward's mother-in-law, who was also the sister of Philip, Jeanne of Valois to intercede on the pope's behalf. Both kings were persuaded to sign the Truce of Espléchin on 25 September 1340. Under the terms of the truce, the English could not attack France for nine months, until 24 June 1341. Edward also had to return to England with the remainder of his army. However, in 1341, before the five years limit was up, conflict over the succession to the Duchy of Brittany began the Breton War of Succession. In a violation of the treaty, Edward backed John of Montfort (the late Duke Jean III's half-brother), forcing Philip VI of France to back Charles of Blois (the husband Jean III's niece). Edward used this as an excuse to restart hostilities with France.
