= English Channel naval campaign, 1338–1339 =

Series of raids by the nascent French navy

- Part of The Hundred Years' War
| Date | March 1338 – October 1339 |
| Location | English Channel |
| Result | Indecisive |

Belligerents
| Kingdom of England; County of Flanders | Kingdom of France: Genoese mercenaries; Castilian mercenaries |

Commanders and leaders
| Robert Morley, Robert Truffel, Richard FitzAlan | Hugues Quiéret, Nicolas Béhuchet |

Strength
| Varied | Varied |

The English Channel naval campaign of the years 1338 and 1339 saw a protracted series of raids conducted by the nascent French navy and numerous private raiders and pirates against English towns, shipping and islands in the English Channel, which caused widespread panic, damage and financial loss to the region and prompted a serious readjustment of English finances during the early stages of the Hundred Years' War. This period was then followed by a French disaster caused by over-confidence and a reversing of roles which had a major effect on the English successes of the next two decades; this result was by no means assured until late 1339 and had the French fought a little longer they might have ended the war before it had really begun.

Coastal raids were not uncommon in fourteenth-century England, with privately owned shipping and occasionally royal ships from France, Castile, Genoa, Scotland and Scandinavia all conducting nuisance attacks against coastal shipping and fishing villages throughout the era, even during periods of peace. What made the naval campaigns of 1338 and 1339 so important was that these were focused and sustained raids with deliberate strategic intent, targeting major English towns rather than isolated hamlets and doing so at a critical point in the developing war.

== The Hundred Years' War ==
In 1338, in the first year of a conflict subsequently called the Hundred Years' War, the French government faced a severe threat on two sides. On the south were the English territories of Gascony and Aquitaine, from which lancing raids and chevauchées could be launched into the French heartlands, and where the boundary was both poorly defined and relied far more on the allegiance of the local fief than upon national designations. To the northeast, the situation was grimmer, with the English-financed armies of Hainaut, Brabant and the Holy Roman Empire either preparing for or threatening invasion of France's northern provinces.

=== Financial troubles ===
King Edward III, the leader of a loose coalition, suffered from financial difficulties; in spite of England's revenues from the control of the wool industry, the king's exchequer was bankrupt. Without English funding, his coalition would collapse, but unable to meet the financial requirements necessary to maintain the army in Flanders, in 1338 after just one campaign, he was unable to continue fighting without borrowing enormous sums from first Jewish then Italian bankers at high rates of interest (which he would later default on, prompting the expulsion of the Jews and separately later a financial crash in Italy). Edward's concerns were common knowledge to other heads of state in Europe and it was recognized by the French that by destroying English ports and shipping, reduced revenue from the wool trade and the inability to move reinforcements across the channel might force Edward to abandon his invasion plans.

== Portsmouth and Jersey ==
At the beginning of February, King Philip VI appointed a new Admiral of France, one Nicholas Béhuchet, who had previously served as a treasury official and now was instructed to wage economic warfare against England. On 24 March 1338 he began his campaign, leading a large fleet of small coastal ships across the Channel from Calais and into the Solent where they landed and burnt the vitally important port-town of Portsmouth. The town was unwalled and undefended and the French were not suspected as they sailed towards the town with English flags flying. The result was a disaster for Edward, as the town's shipping and supplies were looted, the houses, stores, and docks burnt down, and those of the population unable to flee were killed or taken off as slaves. No English ships were available to contest their passage from Portsmouth and none of the militias intended to form in such an instance made an appearance.

The fleet then sailed to the Channel Islands, which had already suffered minor attacks the previous year but now faced a major threat, Jersey being invaded by the French crews and the entire eastern half of the island reduced to ruins, only Mont Orgueil holding out. The raid had been predicted by intelligence officers in the royal household, but defensive measures were woefully inefficient and efforts to intercept the attack had utterly failed.

=== Piracy ===
This raid caused panic in numerous communities of southern England and prompted a flurry of expensive defence precautions along the coastline further reducing Edward's ability to make war on France from the continent. The furthest reaches of the English coast, at Devon and Cornwall refused to supply any materials or money for the war for the remainder of the year, insisting they needed their resources to defend themselves. Such precautions were not misplaced; hearing of the weakness of the English coast, dozens of merchants and landlords in Normandy, Picardy and Brittany bought coastal traders and equipped them for war resulting in pinprick raids and piracy right along the English coastline. Evidence is unclear whether the French understood exactly how effective this tactic was; Béhuchet clearly grasped that by raiding English shipping and cutting off a trade he could cripple the English economy but it is not known if he understood the financial drain his coastal raids had on Edward's exchequer (modern historians tend to think that perhaps he did not but that he considered them to be good for the war effort in any case).

This piracy also affected the other theatre of war, as French and Castilian ships attacked grain, trade and payroll ships between England and Bordeaux, reducing that city and the region it governed to near mutiny, especially after a large food convoy was badly damaged in an action off Talmont on the 23 August, 1338.

== Guernsey and Southampton ==
The campaign at sea resumed in September 1338, when a large French and Italian fleet descended on the Channel Islands once again under Robert VIII Bertrand de Bricquebec, Marshal of France. The island of Sark, which had suffered a serious raid the year before, fell without a fight and Guernsey was captured after a brief campaign. The island was largely undefended, as most of the Channel Islands garrison was in Jersey to prevent another raid there, and the few that were sent to Guernsey and Sark were captured at sea. Messengers from the islands were also captured, preventing the English government from discovering what had happened for over a week. On Guernsey, the forts of Castle Cornet and Vale Castle were the only points to hold out. Neither fort lasted very long as both were undermanned and unprovisioned. The garrisons were put to death. A brief naval battle was fought between Channel Islanders in coastal and fishing vessels and Italian galleys, but despite two of the Italian ships being sunk the Islanders were defeated with heavy casualties. Guernsey remained French for some time, only being relinquished when defending the island became untenable in the aftermath of the battle of Sluys.

The next target for Béhuchet and his lieutenant Hugh Quiéret were the supply lines between England and Flanders, and they gathered 48 large galleys at Harfleur and Dieppe. This fleet then attacked an English squadron at Walcheren on 23 September. The English vessels were unloading cargo and were surprised and overwhelmed after bitter fighting, resulting in the capture of five large and powerful English cogs, including Edward III's flagships the Cog Edward and the Christopher. The captured crews were executed and the ships added to the French fleet. A few days later on 5 October, this force conducted its most damaging raid of all, landing several thousand French, Norman, Italian and Castilian sailors close to the major port of Southampton and assaulting it from both land and sea. The town's walls were old and crumbling and direct orders to repair it had been ignored. Most of the town's militia and citizens fled in panic into the countryside, with only the castle's garrison holding out until a force of Italians breached the defences and the town fell. The scenes of Portsmouth were repeated as the entire town was razed to the ground, thousands of pounds worth of goods and shipping taken back to France, and captives massacred or taken as slaves. The following day militia bands began to harass the French force on the outskirts of the town and the French departed, leaving behind the burning town, which was further damaged by brigands who came to loot before the local authorities could return.

== 1339 ==
An early winter forced a pause in the Channel warfare, and 1339 saw a vastly different situation, as English towns had taken the initiative over the winter and prepared organised militias to drive off raiders more interested in plunder than set-piece battles. Responsibility for these militias was placed in the hands of several leading Earls, who were warned that if they failed to defend their stretch of coastline there would be penalties. Although piracy at sea was still a serious problem, with ships burnt and crews massacred as far north as the Bristol Channel, the large-scale raids of 1338 were over. An attack on Jersey failed as the island was now too strongly defended and attacks on Harwich, Southampton again and Plymouth were driven off with heavy losses, the mercenary elements of the French force unwilling to risk a large scale battle. Hastings was burnt to the ground, but it was little more than a fishing village at the time and did not represent a major success. The combined fleet was reduced to attacking fishing boats and parading the bodies through the streets of Calais.

An English fleet had also been constituted over the winter and this was used in an effort to gain revenge on the French by attacking coastal shipping. The result was an embarrassing disaster as the mercenary captains of the fleet realized that more money could be made by attacking and looting the Flemish convoys of Edward's allies rather than the French, forcing Edward to pay a huge amount of compensation and endure severe diplomatic embarrassment. This force did prove vital though in July when 67 French and mercenary vessels attempted to attack the Cinque Ports. The expedition was met by an organized militia at Sandwich and turned towards Rye, burning several small villages on the way but failing to land at the town. There the English fleet under Robert Morley caught up with them, forcing the French force to flee back across the Channel. This scare had been too much for the Genoese mercenaries who made up the most experienced part of the French fleet, and they demanded more pay. King Philip VI responded by imprisoning fifteen of them, whereupon the others simply returned to Italy, at a stroke costing the French their best sailors and ships as well as two-thirds of their navy.

=== English revenge ===
The English soon heard of this development, Morley taking his fleet to the French coast, burning the towns of Ault and Le Tréport and foraging inland, ravaging several villages and provoking a panic to mirror that at Southampton the year before. He also surprised and destroyed a French fleet in Boulogne harbor. English and Flemish merchants rapidly fitted out raiding ships and soon coastal villages and shipping along the North and even the west coasts of France were under attack. The Flemish navy too was active, sending their fleet against the important port of Dieppe in September and burning it to the ground. These successes did much to rebuild morale in England and the Low Countries as well as repair England's battered trade. It did not however have anything like the financial impact of the earlier French raids as France's continental economy could survive depredations from the sea much better than the maritime English. The following year, however, a naval operation would have a significant effect on the war and provide the first major clash of arms when the English and French fleets met at the battle of Sluys. The victory of the English there, helped substantially by the Italian desertion the year before would provide naval superiority in the Channel for decades to come resulting in the English ability to invade France at several points at once, an advantage that would prove vital in the long war.

== Sources ==
- Rodger, N.A.M., The Safeguard of the Sea, 1997, ISBN 0-00-255128-4
- Sumption, Jonathan, The Hundred Years War, Vol 1, Trial by Battle, 1990, ISBN 0-571-13895-0
