= Hugues Quiéret =

French military officer

- Admiral of France
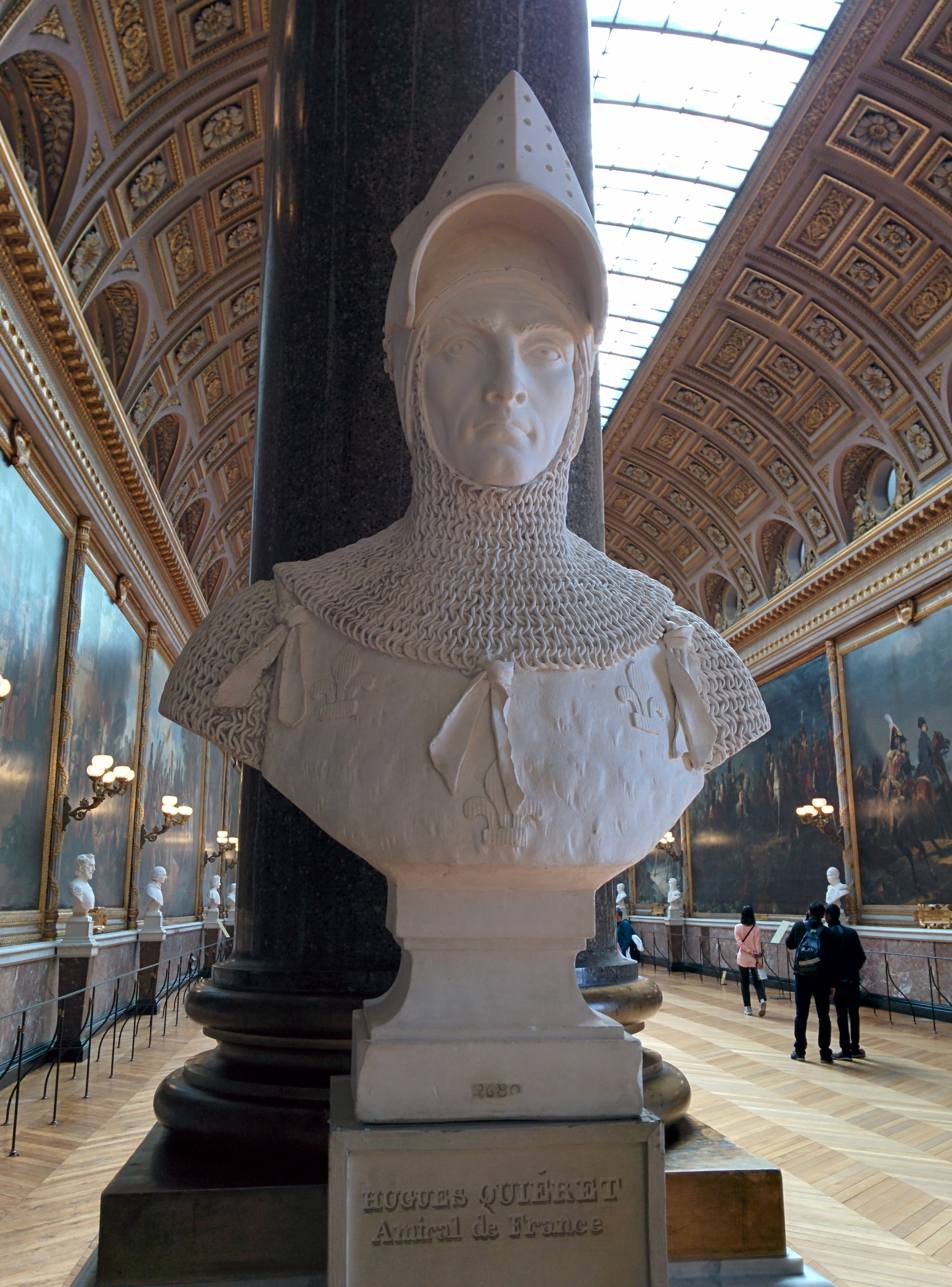
- Born: c. 1290
- Died: 24 June 1340 (aged 49–50) off the coast of Sluys
- Wars and battles: Hundred Years War; English Channel campaign; Battle of Arnemuiden; Battle of Sluys †
- Offices: Grand Master of France

Quiéret's coat of arms

Hugues Quiéret (c. 1290 – 24 June 1340) was a French military officer. He was a knight, lord of Tours-en-Vimeu and of Hamicourt, both in Picardy. Before becoming an admiral, he was an advisor, Chamberlain, Grand Master of France (French: maître d'hôtel du roi), then the seneschal of Beaucaire and Nimes from 1325 to 1332.

He was made an admiral, then captain of Tournay, then an Admiral of France (French: Amiral de France). After several victories, he commanded the French fleet at the Battle of Sluys in 1340, during the Hundred Years' War between France and England, and was wounded, captured and beheaded by the English in revenge for the massacre Quiéret oversaw after the Battle of Arnemuiden.

== Family ==
Hugues's father was also called Hugues; he was a knight and the Lord of Douriez and Fransu (French: Seigneur de Douriez et de Fransu). The Quiéret family claimed descent from lords in Picardy, although no genealogy can be produced. They bore a coat of arms blazoned as "Ermine, three fleurs de lys at the foot fed gules, two lions for supporters" (French: D'hermines, à trois fleurs de lys au pied nourri de gueules support: 2 lions), originating in Hugues Quiéret's marriage in 1312 to Blanche d'Harcourt. Blanche's grandfather, Jean II d'Harcourt (1240–1302), known as 'The Doughty' (French: le Preux), was a Marshal of France (French: maréchal de France) from 1283 and one of the first Admirals of France, from 1295. Hugues and Blanche had several children.

== Career ==
=== Sénéchal de Beaucaire et de Nîmes (1324) ===
Hugues Quieret was made sénéchal of Beaucaire, an important port for galleys, and of Nîmes. He was given orders to escort the Comtesse de Blois from Montpellier to the Château de Corbeil. He was involved in the Gascony War in 1326, and signed an order on 8 May 1332 suppressing the fair at Montagnac.

=== Admiral (1335) ===
Under the reign of Philip VI of France the post of Admiral of France had been reformed, and ceased to be assigned to foreigners, as had previously been the case, and was instead granted to Quiéret as a prominent French noble on 7 December 1335. This did not make him supreme commander of the French fleet, however, but instead the subordinate of Raoul II de Brienne, the Constable of France and Captain General Above and Before All Others of the Army of the Sea (French: capitaine général dessus et devant tous les autres de l'armée de la mer), even if Raoul proved a non-entity. Quiéret sought help from the Count of Flanders in 1336 with the galleys of the Levant (French: galères du Levant; Levant signifying in this case 'east', or 'eastern'). Quiéret was good at organising the fleet, playing a large part in improving the arsenals at Leure (beside Harfleur) and at the Cloes des Galées. However, he was to prove better at organisation than at actual naval combat.

=== Invasion of England (1338) ===
The provinces promised to provide ships to invade England. These ships' aim was to join up with the French king's ships and transport 4,000 men at arms to England, the whole force being known as The Grand Army of the Sea (French: la grande armée de la mer). Preparations were put underway for this expedition in Harfleur and Leure - the latter had been established in the high Middle Ages on the sea-shore of the Seine and on a loop formed by the course of the Lézarde, winding through and joining up the marshlands of the estuary, to the south-west of Harfleur (in 1339 the port at Leure provided 32 ships and 3 galleys for Philip's fleet, more than the output of the ports of Dieppe and Harfleur combined). The preparations are evidenced by a command of 8 November 1338 in which Quiéret commissioned Thomas Fouques, Custodian of the Park of the Galleys of the King (French: garde du clos aux Galées du roi), which installation was then at Rouen (and known as the Cloes des Galées, or the Clos de Rouen; the oldest arsenal in France), to buy at any price the weapons which the mercenaries gathered at Leure and Harfleur had sold off to merchants, and which he proposed they instead take on the expedition. However, the most important document on the preparations is the 'quittance' of 2 July 1338 which proved the fleet used gunpowder, the first documentation of French naval artillery.

The Collection des chroniques nationales françaises writes:

Thus, very early, Hugues Quier and his companions, having heard that their suspicions had proved right and that war had broken out between France and England, came one Sunday morning into the haven of Hantonne (Southampton), while the people were at mass; and the said Normans and Genoese entered the town, and took it, and pillaged it, and robbed it completely, and killed many people, and raped several women and virgins, which was a shameful thing, and charged their nefs and ships with much plunder which they had found in the town, which was fully, thickly and well guarded, and then got back in their nefs

It continues

... you have heard that king Philip of France who retired to Paris, and had given notice to all his great host, and strongly reinforced his great navy which held the sea, of which messire Hugues Quieret, Bahuchet et Barbevaire were captains and commanders. And these three masters held a great fashion of Genoese, Norman, Picard and Breton soldiers; and made many raids that winter on the English, and often ran [up the English Channel] as far as Dover and Sandwich, Winchelsea, Rye and other places along the coasts of England; and the English feared them greatly, for they were so strong at sea that they had more than 40,000 soldiers in their company; and nothing could stop them sortieing out, nor from leaving for England ... and they then pillaged and robbed; and put all to death.

Quiéret also burned English ships at Bristol and Plymouth.

=== Battle of Arnemuiden (September 1338) ===
The Battle of Arnemuiden was a naval battle on 23 September 1338, at the start of the Hundred Years' War, featuring a French fleet under Admirals Hugues Quiéret and Nicolas Béhuchet against a small squadron of five English great cogs, transporting a cargo of wool to the Count of Flanders, ally of Edward III of England. It occurred near Arnemuiden, the port of the island of Walcheren in the Netherlands. Overwhelmed by the superior numbers and with some of their crew still on shore, the English ships fought bravely, especially the Christopher with its three cannon and one hand gun (the battle was the first recorded instance of European usage of naval artillery) under the command of John Kingston, who was also commander of the squadron.. Kingston only surrendered after a day's fighting and exhausting every means of defence. The French captured the rich cargo and took the five cogs into their fleet, but massacred the English prisoners. Hugues Quieret was then made captain of Tournay in 1339.

=== Battle of Sluys ===
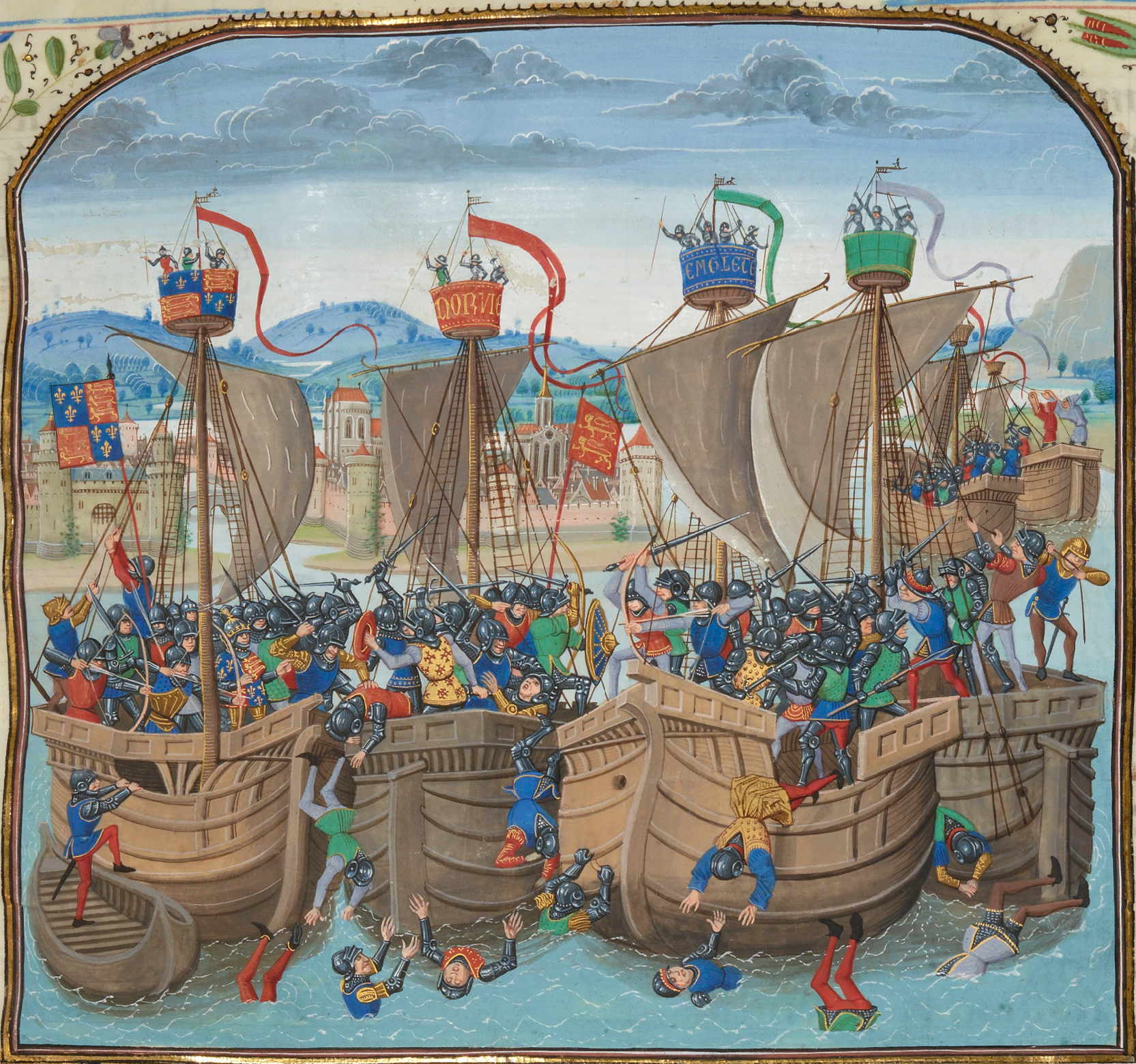
Miniature of the battle in the Chronicles of Jean Froissart

The chronicles write:

Still the king of France greatly reinforced the army that held the sea, and the great army of écumeurs, and ordered messire Hugues Quieret, Barbevaire and the other captains to take care to hold the borders of Flanders, and not to give the king of England any respite, nor let him take any port in Flanders; and if they failed by their own fault, they would all die by execution.

On 24 June 1340, the Battle of Sluys in the Zwin estuary (an arm of the sea, now silted up, which led to Bruges) pitched the numerically dominant French fleet against 150 English ships commanded by Edward III. This was the first major battle of the Hundred Years' War. Besides forty Mediterranean galleys with experienced Genoese crews led by the mercenary Pietro Barbavera, the French also had twenty 'coques' (cogs) crewed by 200 men at arms and around 130 merchant and fishing ships, each with fifty soldiers on board - this made a total of around 30,000 men. The English fleet had 150 ships, 15,000 soldiers and an unknown number of crewmen. The French fleet was commanded by Quiéret and Béhuchet, but they were administrators ordered in principal merely to guarantee an army's safe passage, not frontline fighting sailors. They were ordered to stop Edward's army landing and deployed their fleet in three lines from one river bank to the other, except for four cogs and the Genoese ships; all the ships in the three rows were chained together (presumably to aid in taking advantage of their numbers and armor).

On the morning of 24 June the English appeared. At midday, born down by the tide and wind, they attacked. The French crossbowmen had the initiative but were quickly outmatched by the Welsh longbowmen's speed of fire. After the fleets met there was fierce hand-to-hand fighting. Quieret and Béhuchet tried to surround Edward's ship, the Cog Thomas, and Béhuchet was wounded in the chest. Some sources have Quiéret drowning during the battle, but others state he was captured and immediately beheaded by the English, despite his wounds, in vengeance for the massacre he had allowed at Arnemuiden two years earlier, with his body being thrown into the sea. (Béhuchet was also captured, and hanged.) In the afternoon, thanks to a change in the wind direction, the Flemish fleet was able to leave the river bank and join the battle. Panic gripped the French fleet - having no way to escape other than to swim for it, 17 to 20 thousand French soldiers were killed and only Barbavera and half the Genoese managed to escape. The battle marked the French fleet's destruction and decisive defeat.

== Bibliography ==
- Buchon, Jean Alexandre C. (1826). Collection des Chroniques Nationales Français: Écrites en Langue Vulgaire du Treizième au Seizième Siècle, Avec Notes et Éclaircissements [Collection of French National Chronicles Written in the Vernacular of the Thirteenth to the Sixteenth Century, with Notes and Explanations] (in French). Verdière [et] J. Carez.
- Jones, Michael; McKitterick, Rosamond, eds. (2000). The New Cambridge Medieval History: Volume 6, C.1300-c.1415. Cambridge: Cambridge University Press. ISBN 978-0-521-36290-0.
- Kibler, William W.; Zinn, Grover A.; Henneman, John Bell; Earp, Lawrence, eds. (1995). Medieval France: An Encyclopedia. Taylor & Francis. ISBN 978-0-8240-4444-2.
- Mortimer, Ian (2006). The Perfect King: The Life of Edward III, Father of the English Nation. London: Jonathan Cape. ISBN 978-0-224-07301-1.
- Dickie, Iain; Dougherty, Martin J.; Jestice, Phyllis G.; Jörgensen, Christer; Rice, Rob S. (2009). Fighting Techniques of Naval Warfare: Strategy, Weapons, Commanders, and Ships: 1190 BC - Present. St. Martin's Press. ISBN 978-0-312-55453-8.
- Rodger, Nicholas A. M. (1999). The Safeguard of the Sea: A Naval History of Britain. 660-1649. New York: W W Norton & Company. ISBN 978-0-393-31960-6.
