= Jean V Sire de Poix =

French knight and noble (1378–1415)

Jean V Sire de Poix (1378 – 25 October 1415) was a French knight and noble from the Tyrel de Poix family. Jean V was an adviser and chamberlain to king Charles VI, and was involved in the military campaigns of the Hundred Years' War. Jean V fought alongside his uncle, Jeannet de Poix, against the English army at the Battle of Agincourt on 25 October 1415. Jean V was killed during the fighting, although the circumstances surrounding his death are unclear.

Jeannet de Poix was taken prisoner and ransomed by Sir Nicholas Merbury. Upon his release, Jeannet became the 31st Admiral of France in 1418, however he died the same year of the plague.
