= Petrus de Canaberiis =

- Knight
- Born: 13th Century; Paris, Île-de-France
- Died: 14th Century; France
- Occupation: Diplomat; Politician

Petrus de Canaberiis (fl. 1280) was a French knight. He served as ambassador of Philip IV of France in Norway.

== Biography ==
Petrus Canaberiis was possibly born in Paris, he was sent to Norway along with other knights, by Philip the Fair, to carry out a diplomatic mission, concerning reaching an agreement between France and Norway. They were received by Audun Hugleiksson.

In 1280, Petrus Canaberiis participated in the "tournoi du Hem", a chivalric festivity in France, event attended by knights of Normandy, Flanders, and England.
