= Robert de Houdetot =

14th century French nobleman

Robert de Houdetot was a French admiral and nobleman.

== Biography ==
Robert was a son of Richard II de Houdetot. After the disastrous defeat of the French fleet at Sluys, Flanders, he was appointed an Admiral of France in 1340 and undertook retaliatory raids against English shipping.

He was seneschal of the Agenais and master-bowman in 1345 and laid siege to Casseneuil during 1345. While undertaking a siege of the château at Bajamont in 1346 he was taken prisoner. Robert was known as the grand master of the king's crossbows in 1352.
