= Hem-Monacu =

- Commune
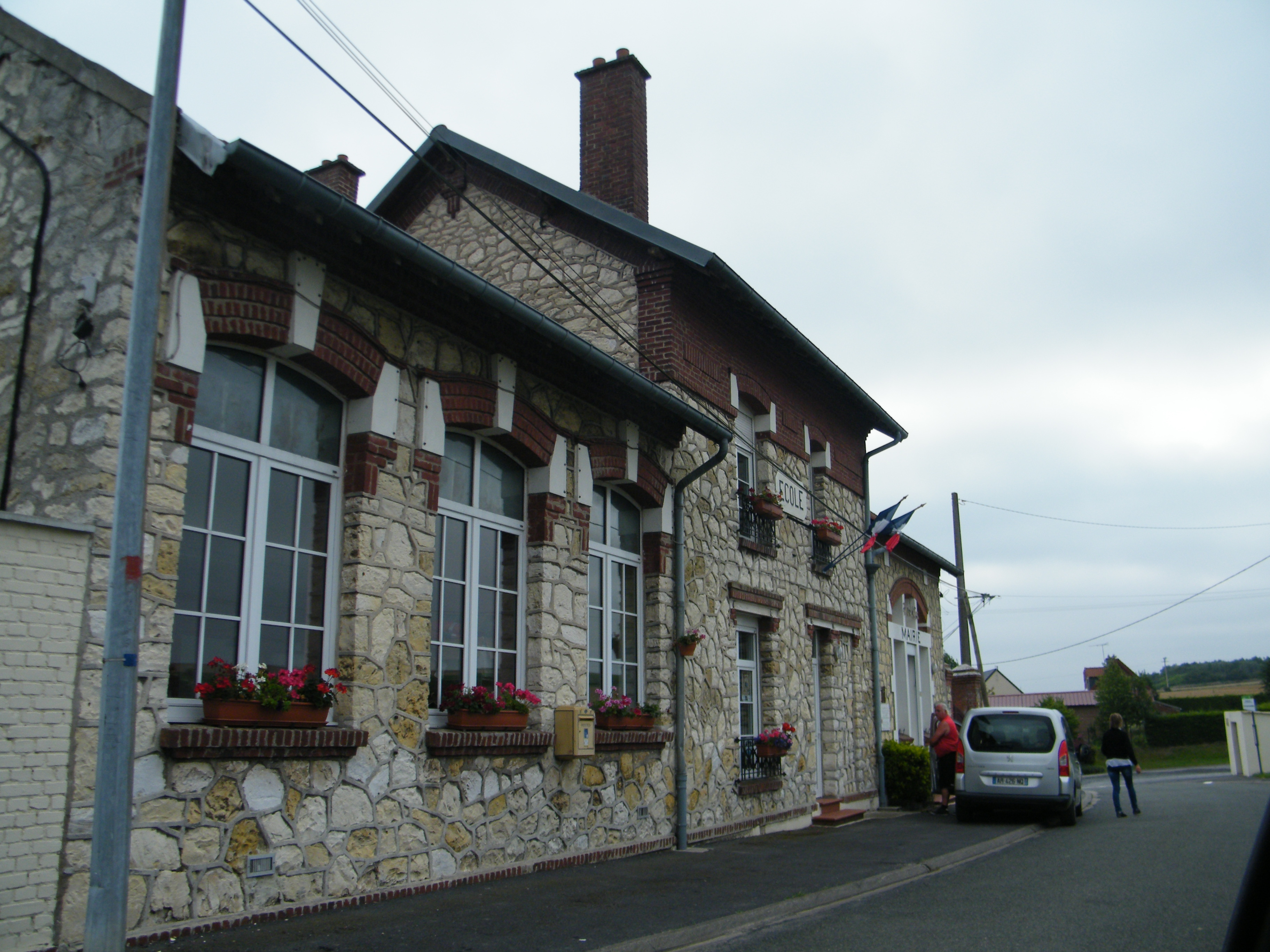
- The town hall and school in Hem-Monacu
- Location of Hem-Monacu
- Location within France Location within Hauts-de-France
- Coordinates: 49°57′22″N 2°50′24″E
- Country: France
- Region: Hauts-de-France
- Department: Somme
- Arrondissement: Péronne
- Canton: Péronne
- Intercommunality: Haute Somme

Government
  - Mayor (2020–2026): Bernard Delefortrie
- Area^{1}: 3.66 km^{2} (1.41 sq mi)
- Elevation: 52 m (171 ft)
- Highest elevation: 112 m (367 ft)
- Lowest elevation: 42 m (138 ft)
- Population (2023): 137
  - Density: 37.4/km^{2} (96.9/sq mi)
- Time zone: UTC+01:00 (CET)
  - Summer (DST): UTC+02:00 (CEST)
- INSEE/Postal code: 80428 /80360
- ^{1} French Land Register data, which excludes lakes, ponds, glaciers > 1 km^{2} (0.386 sq mi or 247 acres) and river estuaries.

Hem-Monacu is a commune in the Somme department in Hauts-de-France in northern France.

== Geography ==
The commune is situated on the D146 road, some 25 miles (40 km) northeast of Amiens, by the banks of the river Somme. The A1 autoroute is less than 1 mile (2 km) away.

== History ==
The tournamente described in the Romance of Le Hem took place at Hem-Monacu in October 1278.

== Population ==
Historical population
Year	Pop.	±% p.a.
1968	85	—
1975	81	−0.69%
1982	81	+0.00%
1990	96	+2.15%
1999	98	+0.23%
2007	133	+3.89%
2012	125	−1.23%
2017	128	+0.48%
2023	137	+1.14%
Source: INSEE

== See also ==
- Communes of the Somme department
