= Seneschal of the Agenais =

Official French rôle of the Late Middle Ages

The Seneschal of the Agenais was an officer carrying out and managing the domestic affairs of the lord of the former county and district of Agenais. During the course of the twelfth century, the seneschalship, also became an office of military command.

The seneschal managed the household, coordinating between the receivers of various landholdings and the chamber, treasury, and the chancellory or chapel. The seneschals of the Agenais, like those appointed in Périgord, Poitou, and Najou had custody of demesne fortresses, the regional treasuries, and presidency of the highest court of regional custom.

== List of Seneschals ==
- Jean I de Grailly (1282)
- Ramon Durand (1304–1305)
- Arnould de Caupenne (1307)
- Pierre de Mermande (1317)
- Robert de Houdetot (1346)
- Richard Walkfare (1366)
- Nopar, Lord of Caumont (1399)
