= Robert de Bracquemont =

French noble

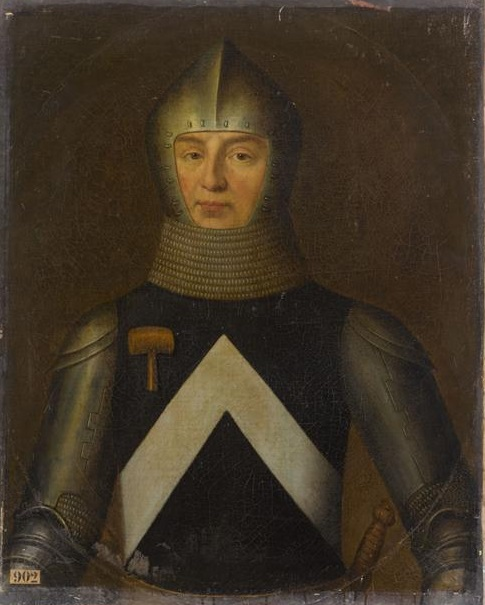

Governor of Honfleur
- In office 1415–1417
- Monarch: Charles VI of France

Personal details
- Born: c.1340 Normandy, France
- Died: April 4, 1419 Mocejón, Toledo, Spain
- Occupation: politician
- Profession: Army's officer

Military service
- Allegiance: Kingdom of France; Crown of Castile
- Rank: Admiral of France

Robert de Bracquemont or Mosén Rubí de Bracamonte, also known as Rubín and as Braquemont (1350s-1419), 1st Lord of Fuente el Sol and Rubí de Bracamonte, was a Norman nobleman, who served as Admiral of France and Castile.

== Biography ==
Robert was the fourth son of Renaud II de Bracquemont, and grandson of Regnault I de Bracquemont and Isabel de Bethencourt. His first wife was Inés González de Mendoza, daughter of Pedro González de Mendoza and Aldonza Fernández de Ayala, belonging to the powerful House of Mendoza.

He arrived in Castile in 1386, as French ambassador to the Castilian court of Henry III. In 1415 Robert de Bracquemont became an Admiral of France. Between 1415 and 1417 he served as governor of Honfleur.

He was given certain royal prerogatives at Mocejón in Toledo, where he died in 1419.
