= Aubert II de Longueval =

French noble and knight (1238–1285)

Aubert II de Longueval (1238–1285) was a French noble and knight in the 13th century who served as the second Admiral of France.

== Biography ==
He was a member of the House of Longueval, from Picardy, whose descendants include Charles Bonaventure de Longueval and many other lords that fought and died for their King.

Aubert de Longueval was an accomplished knight who organized the famous tournament of Le Hem with Huart de Bazentin in 1278 outside the town of Péronne, which was a theatrical spectacle based on the legends of King Arthur, with Count Robert I of Artois in attendance.

He was made Admiral of France some time after the Eighth Crusade in 1270, when King Louis IX created the post of Admiral of France. He was killed in 1285 while commanding the fleet at the siege of Girona during the Aragonese Crusade.
