= Nicolas Béhuchet =

French admiral and financier

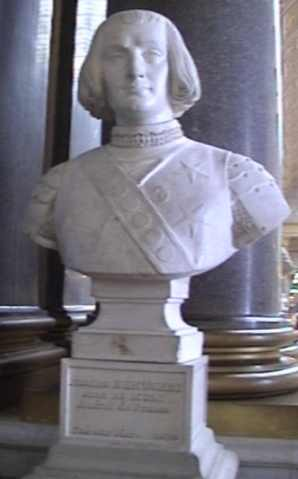
- Nicolas Béhuchet
- Born: c. 1288
- Died: 24 June 1340 (aged 51–52)
- Military career
- Allegiance: French
- Branch: Navy
- Rank: Constable of France
- Conflicts: English Channel campaign Battle of Arnemuiden; Battle of Sluys

Nicolas Béhuchet de Musy de La Loupe d'Escrignolles (French pronunciation: [nikɔlɑ be.yʃɛ də myzi də la lup dɛkʁiɲɔl]; 1288 – 24 June 1340), also known as Colin Béhuchet, was a French military officer and financier. Together with Hugues Quiéret, he commanded the French fleet during the early phases of the Hundred Years' War.

At the battle of Arnemuiden in 1338, Béhuchet ordered the English prisoners massacred. The following years, he and Quiéret fought the English in the Channel. Two years after Arnemuiden, the French fleet was anchored at Sluys in preparation of an invasion of England. The fleet was attacked by Edward III's English fleet and was destroyed in the Battle of Sluys. During the battle, Béhuchet linked his ships together, effectively forming a wall to prevent the English from landing at the city of Sluys. However, the French fleet, primarily consisting of galleys, was best suited for combat in open waters, where the superior speed and agility of the ships could outmaneuver the English Cogs. Béhuchet's strategy resulted in the deaths of nearly 20,000 French Sailors, and the destruction or capture of over 200 ships, nearly the entirety of the French Navy. After this defeat, the captured Béhuchet was hanged as a revenge for the massacre at Arnemuiden.

== Biography ==
=== Fancier in the service of the Valois ===
Béhuchet was a burgher from Le Mans, who served as a financial agent of Charles de Valois (the Count of Valois and fourth son of King Philip III of France) from 1310 onwards. In 1314, he granted his power of attourney to a fellow citizen of Le Mans to settle a dispute with the prince. Béhuchet's primarily employer was Philippe de Valois, son of Charles de Valois and the succeeding Count of Le Mans, for whom he handled financial transactions and served as a tax collector.

After Philippe of Valois ascended to the throne in 1328, he appointed Béhuchet as the "master of his waters and forests". That same year, Béhuchet played a role in the organisation of garrisons in Flanders. In September of that year, he also acquired the titles of seigneur of Musy, La Loupe and Escrignolles, through land acquisition. Additionally, he became master of the Chambre des Comptes, which dealt with taxation and financial negotiations. A notable achievement of Béhuchet's was implementing a tax levy of four deniers per pound on goods leaving the kingdom. In 1331, Béhuchet de Musy was appointed the king's treasurer - a position he held for several years.

He married Eleanor de Dreux-Beaussart. Eleanor was a descendant of Louis VI of France and held the title of Lady of Châteauneuf. Her family were descended from the Viscounts of Beu, the youngest branch of the Capetian House of Dreux.

=== Commander of the French Fleet ===
During the onset of the Hundred Years' War, Nicolas Béhuchet de Musy was appointed as the commanding officer of the French squadrons, serving as the "captain general of the sea army". Utilising his navy, he carried out multiple raids on the English coastline due to the ongoing Franco-English dispute over the French Crown's succession.

The king of England at the time, Edward III, who was the grandson of Philip the Fair, was removed from the line of succession to the French throne in 1328. This decision was based on the events during the reign of Louis X of France in 1316. In response, Edward launched a military campaign to claim the French Crown, thus sparking a new conflict between France and England.

Béhuchet launched naval attacks against the Isle of Jersey, but was unable to conquer it due to resistance from the Jerseyans commanded by Lord Renaud V of Carteret and his aide-de-camp, Drouet de Barentin, who was killed at the Château de Mont-Orgueil. Renaud V succeeded Drouet as keeper of the Isle of Jersey and successfully defended it against French forces.

In contrast, unlike its neighbour, the island of Guernsey was conquered and occupied by French troops who landed under the command of Béhuchet de Musy.

On 24 March 1338, his ships burnt and pillaged Portsmouth. He also launched an attack on Alderney in the same year.

On 23 September 1338, he and Hugues Quieret defeated the English the Battle of Arnemuiden, at the end of which the English prisoners were massacred. While the English were defeated, the battle was incredibly one-sided, consisting of 48 French warships against 5 English cogs. Somehow, despite the numerical superiority of the French, both sides sustained similar casulties

=== Battle of l'Écluse ===
In 1340, Béhuchet was chosen by the King, along with Quieret, to lead the French fleet and prevent Edward III's army from landing near L'Écluse. The two commanders decided to transform the fleet into a defensive barrier to stop the English fleet. However, on 24 June, the English fleet wiped out the French ships, resulting in numerous sailors drowning as they were unable to flee.

Béhuchet was captured by the English and hanged on the spot for the massacre he oversaw at Arnemuiden.
