= Arnemuiden =

- City
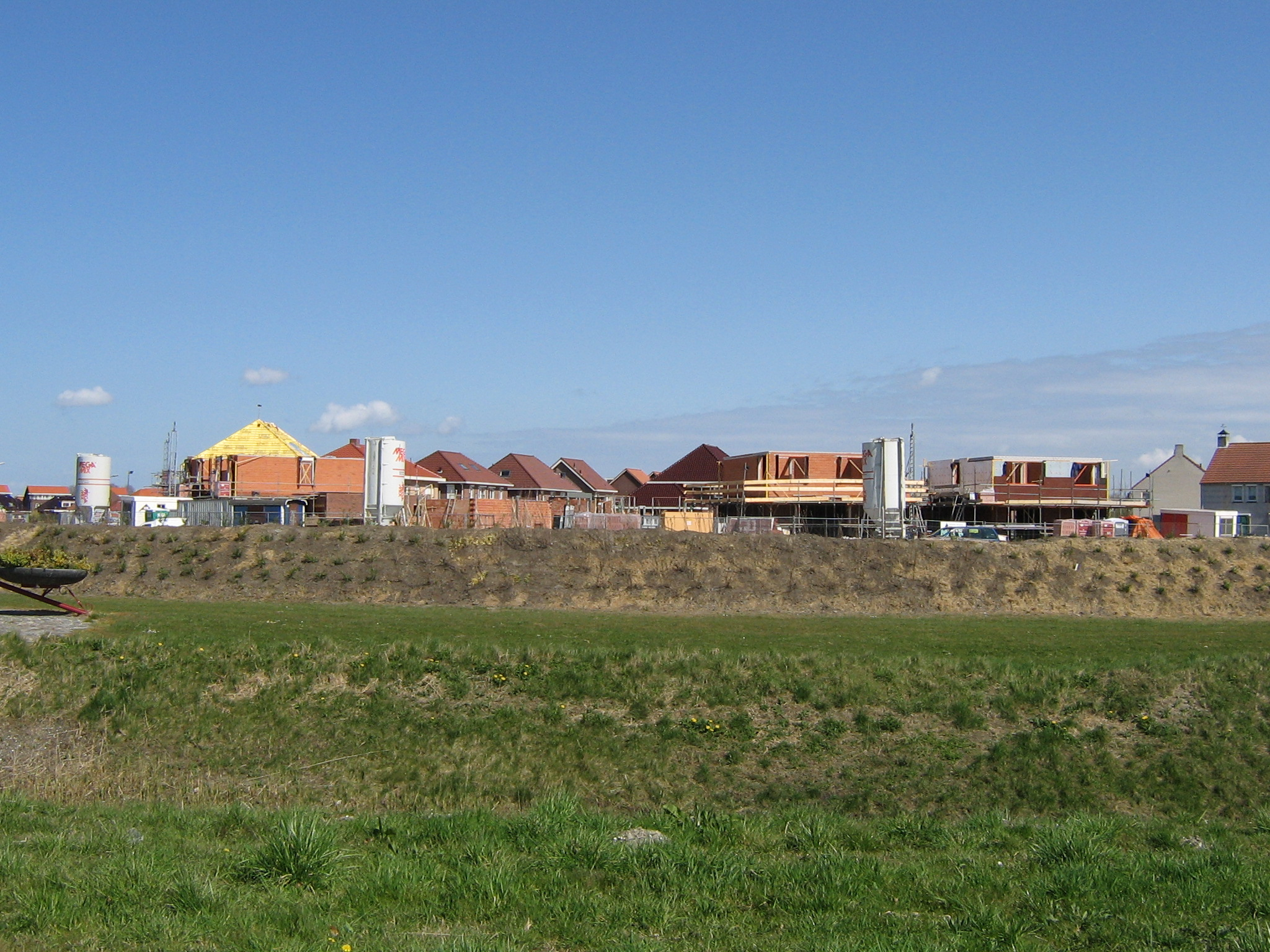
- Arnemuiden in 2006

- Flag Coat of arms

- Location of Arnemuiden in the province of Zeeland Arnemuiden (Netherlands)
- Coordinates: 51°30′N 3°40′E
- Country: Netherlands
- Province: Zeeland
- Municipality: Middelburg

Area
  - Total: 1.28 km^{2} (0.49 sq mi)
- Elevation: 2.8 m (9.2 ft)

Population (2021)
  - Total: 5,075
  - Density: 3,960/km^{2} (10,300/sq mi)
- Time zone: UTC+1 (CET)
  - Summer (DST): UTC+2 (CEST)
- Postal code: 4341
- Dialing code: 0118

Arnemuiden is a city of around 5000 people in the municipality of Middelburg in the province of Zeeland in the Netherlands. It is located on the former island of Walcheren, about 3 km east of the city of Middelburg.

On 23 September 1338, at the start of the Hundred Years' War between England and France, a naval battle was held near Arnemuiden. It was the first naval battle of the Hundred Years' War and the first naval battle using artillery, as the English ship Christofer had three cannons and one handgun.

In 1573, Arnemuiden was destroyed by Spanish troops and more than 300 citizens were killed. Even though only a couple of hundred people were left, it received city rights in 1574.

Until 1997, Arnemuiden was a separate municipality. Arnemuiden has a railway station - Arnemuiden railway station.

A substantial part of the inhabitants of Arnemuiden have been a fisherman in some part of their life. This explains the immense popularity of tattoos and fishing ship earrings in the village.

"De klok van Arnemuiden" is a Dutch song about the church clock at the Arnemuiden central market.

== Gallery ==
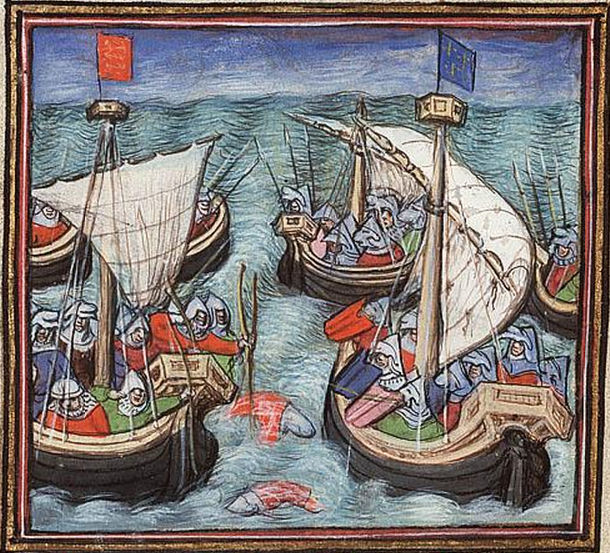
The Battle of Arnemuiden in 1338.

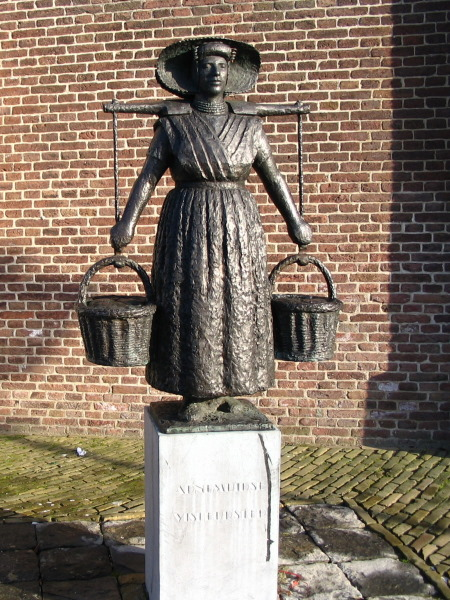
Sculpture Female fish pedlar (Arnemuidse visleurster)

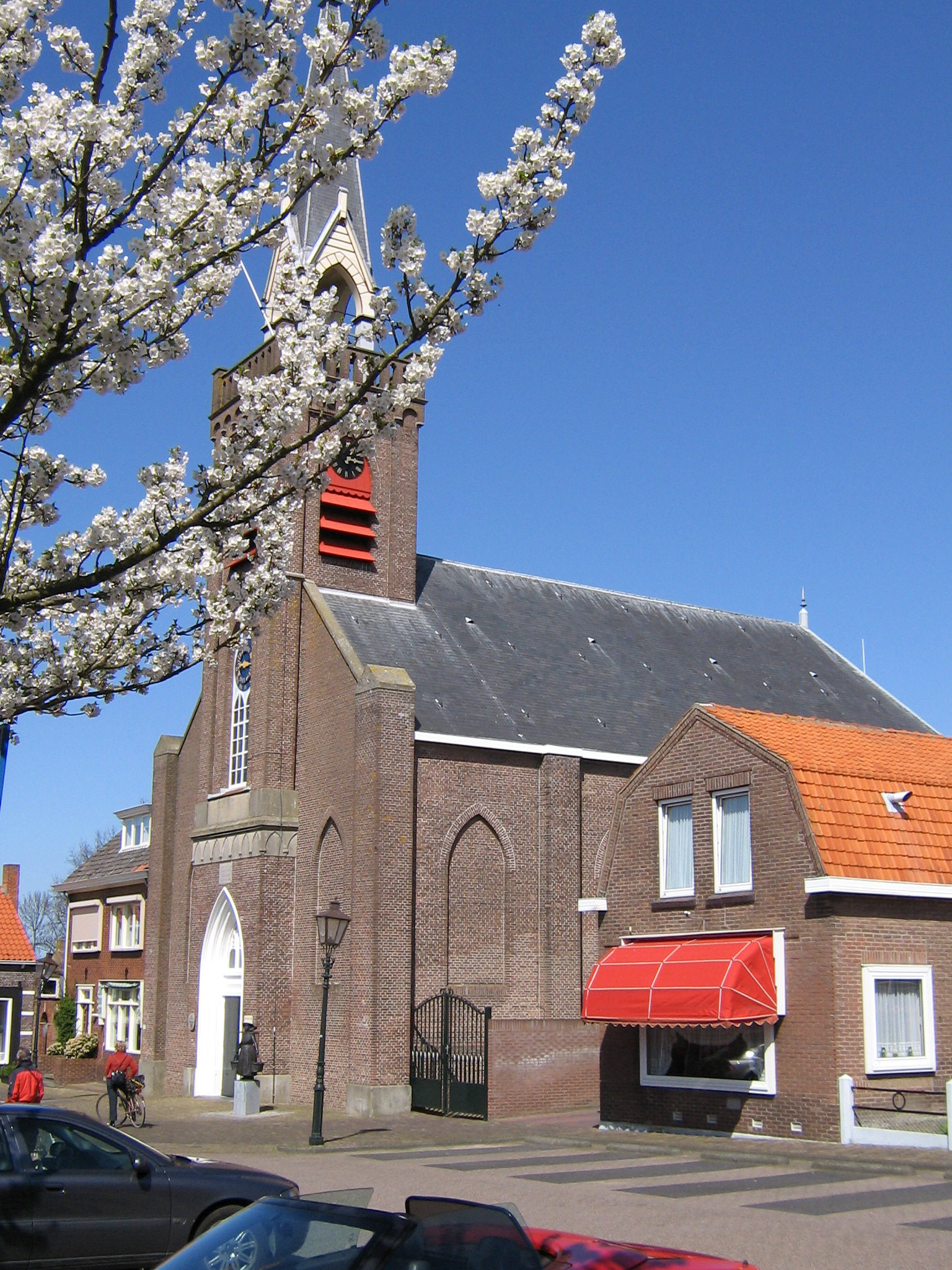
Church in Arnemuiden

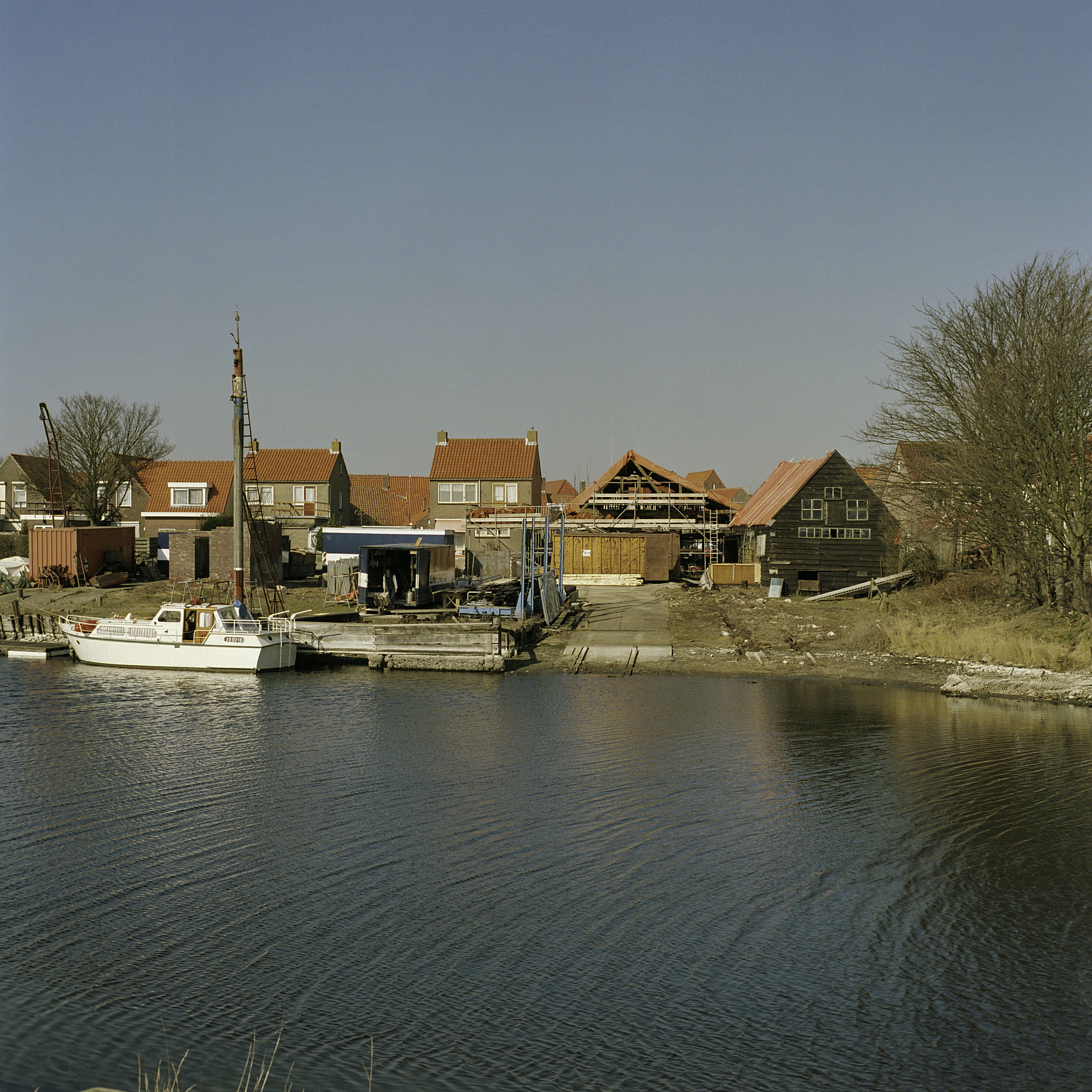
Ship wharf

== Notable people ==
- Jan Paul Van Hecke (Born 2000), footballer who currently plays at Tottenham Hotspur F.C.
