= Romance of Le Hem =

Start of the Romance in MS fr. 1588

The Romance of Le Hem (French: Roman du Hem) is an Old French verse account of a tournament that took place at Le Hem (now Hem-Monacu) over two days in October 1278. It was written by the otherwise unknown Sarrasin, an eyewitness who was commissioned, according to the text itself, by the 'queen' of the tournament, the unnamed sister of Lord Aubert II de Longueval.

== Date ==
The date of the tournament is derived from the poem itself, the year from a reading of lines 104–111 and the day from line 367, which says that the tournament will begin on the feast of Saint Denis (9 October). The tournament lasts two days in the poem, although three days were apparently planned.

In the final line of the poem, Sarrasin promises to complete it auwen, meaning "within the year" or "before the year is out". The meaning of this statement is ambiguous. It could mean either before the end of the calendar year or within a year's time (i.e., before October 1279). In northern France, the calendar year typically changed on Lady Day (25 March), although royal usage favoured Easter, which fell on 2 April in 1279. It is likely that the text was complete before Robert, Count of Clermont, was injured in a tournament in May 1279, since Robert is prominent in the poem and this fact is not mentioned. Roger Middleton concludes that the work may well have been finished by the end of 1278.

== Author ==
The author of the poem, Sarrasin, is not known with certainty from any other source. The poem's first editor, Albert Henry, denied that he was Jean Sarrasin, chamberlain to Louis IX, some of whose letters survive. Henry suggested that he may in fact have been an ancestor of the Sarrasin family recorded in Arras in the 16th century. Alison Stones notes that the name was not unknown in the region in the 13th century, being recorded at least seven times, both in the masculine form as well as the feminine (Sarrasine) and as a surname between, 1204 and 1276.

== Contents ==
The Romance is written in octosyllabic rhyming couplets. The tournament begins with a bit of theatre, and there are what appear to be two further scripted theatrical interludes, all accompanied by banqueting. The bulk of the poem covers 180 jousts. As such, it sometimes descendes into a register of names or a roll of honour. Its literary quality is not high. Nigel Bryant, who has translated it into English, likens it to sports journalism and considers its repititiousness unavoidable in light of its material. In the same vein, it is not unbiased, the praises doled out being correlated with the jouster's closeness to the tournament's organizers—and Sarrasin's clients.

== Accuracy and artificiality ==
The tournament at Le Hem is not mentioned in any other source and the historicity of the Romance has been called into question. As a literary work, the Romance has an "air of artificiality" and "may in fact strike the first-time reader as downright fanciful." On the other hand, certain facts suggest a grounding in reality. The Romance belongs "to no established genre", making it "difficult to imagine a purely literary origin". The close attention paid to all the minor actors "in what must have been a rather insignificant tournament implies a special local interest." The names, moreover, can be mostly be verified independently, creating "a presumption of some authenticity".

According to Nigel Bryant, the Romance, "however outlandish it may initially seem, records in a perfectly logical way the planned thinking that underlay the elaborate mixture of martial sport and theatre that constituted the festival at Le Hem." For example, the appearance of Lady Courtesy to guide Aubert de Longueval and Huart de Bazentin when they were planning the tournament may be read either as a means of praising "the generous, positive spirit" of the planners or a whimsical way of declaring them inspired.

== Manuscripts ==
The autograph manuscript of the Romance is not preserved. It survives in a single copy written probably before the end of the 13th century, now MS Français 1588 in the Bibliothèque nationale de France. The manuscript contains several works by Philippe de Rémi besides the Romance, which is the final work, at folios (leaves) 115r–143v. The manuscript has Picard features throughout.

The copy in Français 1588 is not complete but is missing its first few lines and much of lines 4519–4600. The leaf containing the opening was cut out, probably for a miniature illustration. It contained, besides the start of the Romance, the end of Salus a refrains by Philippe de Rémi. The poem in its present state begins with a 'he' on folio 115r, which can only be the author, who probably named himself in the lost lines. He may also have provided the work with a dedication. The last leaf is torn, leaving lines 4519–4600 too fragmentary to be reconstructed. The end of the work is intact, as is the explicit, which reads:

Here ends the Romance of Le Hem, and Sarrasin says that if he's come up trumps with it, a large part of the credit should go to God.

== Bibliography ==
- Bryant, Nigel, ed. (2020). The Tournaments at Le Hem and Chauvency. Boydell & Brewer.
- Henry, Albert, ed. (1939). Sarrasin: Le Roman du Hem. Société d'édition «Les Belles Lettres».
- Långfors, Arthur; Jeanroy, Alfred (1940). "Compte rendu: Sarrasin, Le Roman du Hem, édité par Albert Henry". Romania. 66 (261): 103–109.
- Middleton, Roger (1999). "The History of Paris BNF Fr. 1588". In Barbara N. Sargent-Baur (ed.). Le Roman de la Manekine: Edited from Paris BNF fr. 1588 and Translated. Brill. pp. 41–68.
- Regalado, Nancy Freeman (2007). "A Contract for an Early Festival Book: Sarrasin's Le Roman du Hem (1278)". In Laurie Postlewate; Wim Hüsken (eds.). Acts and Texts: Performance and Ritual in the Middle Ages and the Renaissance. Brill. pp. 249–267.
- Stones, Alison (1999). "The Manuscript, Paris BNP fr. 1588, and Its Illustrations". In Barbara N. Sargent-Baur (ed.). Le Roman de la Manekine: Edited from Paris BNF fr. 1588 and Translated. Brill. pp. 1–40.
- Vale, Juliet (1983). Edward III and Chivalry: Chivalric Society and its Context, 1270–1350. The Boydell Press.
