= Admiral of France =

French title of honour

Admiral of France Amiral de France
- Shoulder and sleeve insignia
- Country: France
- Service branch: French Navy
- Rank group: Flag officer
- NATO rank code: OF-10
- Formation: 1270
- Next lower rank: Admiral
- Equivalent ranks: Marshal of France

Admiral of France (French: Amiral de France) is a French title of honour. It is the naval equivalent of Marshal of France and was one of the Great Officers of the Crown of France.

== History ==
The title was created in 1270 by Louis IX of France, during the Eighth Crusade. At the time, it was equivalent to the office of Constable of France. The Admiral was responsible for defending the coasts of Picardy, Normandy, Aunis, and Saintonge. In times of war, it was his responsibility to assemble French merchant ships into a navy. He had to arm, equip, and supply the ships for the course of the war, and give letters of marque to corsairs. In peacetime, he was responsible for the maintenance of the royal fleet (when one existed). He was also responsible for maritime commerce and the merchant fleet.

During the modern era, few admirals were sailors; moreover, with the exception of Claude d'Annebault, none of them actually commanded the fleet. It must be said that the actual power of the admiral was rather small, partly because of the creation of other admirals (the Admiral of the Levant for Provence, the Admiral of Brittany, and the Admiral of the West for Guyenne), and because of the creation of the General of the Galleys and the Secretary of State for the Navy.

The title, like the title of Constable, had much more political importance (which would eventually lead to the suppression of both titles). It was also a lucrative position: the admiral was allocated a part of the fines and confiscations imposed by the admiralty, and he had a right to unclaimed ships and shipwrecks as well as a tenth of the spoils taken in battle. He also had juridical rights, comparable to those exercised by the constable and the marshal. This was known as the Table de marbre, after the seat of the admiralty in Paris. A second headquarters of the admiralty was established at Rouen, and about 50 other headquarters were set up at various other places around the coast of France. These tribunals judged cases dealing with fishing disputes and any crimes committed in the country's ports.

The Admiralty was suppressed in 1627 by Cardinal Richelieu, who had been named to the newly created post of Grand Master of Navigation and who wanted to bring all naval authority under one position. The position was recreated in 1669, but was now only an honorific title. The first new admiral was Louis, Count of Vermandois, who at the time was only 2 years old. Thereafter, only Louis Alexandre, Count of Toulouse involved himself in maritime affairs.

It was suppressed once more in 1791, restored in 1805 in the person of Marshal of France Joachim Murat. Currently, the most recent Admiral of France was François Thomas Tréhouart, in 1869.

This dignity remains fully valid today as a 2005 law article recalls: "The title of Marshal of France and that of Admiral of France, is a dignity in the state."

== Admirals ==
- Florent de Varennes, 1270 – First admiral of France
- Aubert II de Longueval – killed in naval combat in 1283 along the coasts of the Crown of Aragon
- Othon de Torcy, 1296–1297
- Mathieu IV of Montmorency, 1297–1304
- Rainier I of Monaco, Lord of Cagnes, 1304–1314
- Hugues Quiéret, 1335–1340
- Nicolas Béhuchet, 1338–1340
- Antonio Aithone Doria, 1339
- Robert de Houdetot, 1340
- Luis de la Cerda, prince of Fortuna, 1341
- Charles I, Lord of Monaco, 1342
- Pierre Flotte de Revel, March 28, 1345 – 1347
- Jean de Nanteuil, 1347–1356
- vacant 1356–1359
- Enguerran de Mentenay 1359
- Jean "Baudran" de la Heuse, 1359–1368
- François de Perilleux, 1368–1369
- Aymeri VI, Viscount of Narbonne, 1369–1373
- Jean de Vienne, 1373–1396
- Renaud de Trie, lord of Sérifontaine, 1397–1405
- Pierre de Bréban, called Clignet, 1405–1408
- Jacques de Châtillon, lord of Dampierre, 1408–1415
- Robert de Bracquemont, called Robinet, 1417–1418
- Jeannet de Poix, 1418
- Charles de Recourt, viscount of Beauvoir, 1418–1419
- Georges de Beauvoir de Chastellux, 1420
- Louis de Culant, 1421–1437
- André de Laval-Montmorency, lord of Lohéac and baron of Retz, 1437–1439
- Prégent VII de Coëtivy, 1439–1450
- Jean V de Bueil de Montrésor, 1450–1477
- Jean de Montauban, 8 October 1461 – 1466
- Louis de Bourbon, Count of Roussillon, bastard son of Charles I, Duke of Bourbon, 1466–1486; legitimated 1463
- Charles II d'Amboise, 1508–1511
- Louis Malet de Graville, 1511–1516
- Guillaume Gouffier, lord of Bonnivet, 1517–1525
- Philippe de Chabot, lord of Brion (called Amiral de Brion), count of Charni, 1525–1543
- Claude d'Annebault, 1543–1552
- Gaspard de Coligny, lord of Châtillon-sur-Loing, 1552–1572
- Honorat II de Savoye, Marquess of Villars, 1572–1578
- Charles de Guise, Duke of Mayenne, 1578–1582
- Anne de Joyeuse, 1582–1587
- Jean Louis de Nogaret de La Valette, Duke of Épernon, 1587–1589
- Bernard de Nogaret, lord of La Valette, 1589–1590
- Antoine de Brichanteau, Marquess of Beauvais-Nangis 1589–1592
- Charles de Gontaut, Duke of Biron, 1592–1594
- André de Brancas, Marquess of Villars, 1594–1595
- Charles de Montmorency-Damville, Duke of Damville, 1596–1612
- Henri II de Montmorency, 1612–1626

=== Grand Masters of Navigation ===
- Cardinal Richelieu, 1626–1642
- Jean Armand de Maillé-Brézé, 1642–1646
- Anne of Austria, 1646–1650
- César, Duke of Vendôme, 1651–1665

=== Restoration of the title Admiral of France ===
- Louis, Count of Vermandois, 1669–1683
- Louis Alexandre, Count of Toulouse, 1683–1737
- Louis Jean Marie de Bourbon, Duke of Penthièvre, 1737–1789

=== Revolutionary and post-revolutionary period ===
- Charles Hector d'Estaing, 1792 (First Republic)
- Joachim Murat, 1805–1814 (First Empire)
- Louis-Antoine d'Artois, Duke of Angoulême, 1814–1830 (Bourbon Restoration)

=== July Monarchy, Second Republic and Empire ===
- Guy-Victor Duperré, 1830
- Laurent Truguet, 1831
- Albin Roussin, 1840–1847
- Ange René Armand, Baron of Mackau, 1847–1854
- Charles Baudin, 1854
- Ferdinand-Alphonse Hamelin, 1854
- Alexandre Ferdinand Parseval-Deschenes, December 2, 1854
- Armand Joseph Bruat, 1855
- Joseph Romain-Desfossés, 1860
- Charles Rigault de Genouilly, 1864
- Léonard Charner, 1864
- François Thomas Tréhouart, 1869

=== English admirals ===
Henry VI of England appointed two English aristocrats during the ministrations of Louis de Culant and André de Laval-Montmorency. Accordingly, they were not recognized by the Kingdom of France.

- William de la Pole, 1st Duke of Suffolk, 1424–1437 (during the ministration of Louis de Culant)
- Edward de Courtenay, 1439 (during the ministration of André de Laval-Montmorency)

== Sources ==
- B. Barbiche, Les institutions de la monarchie française à l'époque moderne, Presses universitaires de France, 1999.
- Musée national de Versailles Galeries historiques du Palais de Versailles, book 7, Imprimerie royale, 1842.
- Philippe Le Bas, France dictionnaire encyclopedique, tome 1, A-AZ, 1810.
- Le Roux, Nicolas (2000). La Faveur du Roi: Mignons et Courtisans au Temps des Derniers Valois. Champ Vallon.
