= Battle of Mello =

Battle during the Hundred Years' War

Coordinates: 49°16′23″N 2°21′59″E

- Part of the Jacquerie of 1358
Date	10 June 1358
Location	Mello and Meaux, Beauvais, north-east of Paris
Result	Total noble victory

Belligerents
Noble coalition	Peasant Jacques army

Commanders and leaders
Charles II of Navarre	Guillaume Cale

Strength
1,500–2,500	4,000–5,000

Casualties and losses
Light	Almost total

The Battle of Mello was the decisive and largest engagement of the Peasant Jacquerie of 1358, a rebellion of peasants in the Beauvais region of France, a major upheaval in this region at the height of the Hundred Years' War with England. The battle was fought at almost the same time as another major battle fought at Meaux, where the Jacquerie rebels (or Jacques Bonhommes) joined the Parisian militia in assaulting a royal stronghold.

== Road to Battle ==
The rebellion in the Beauvais was the heart of Jacquerie which began on 28 May 1358 in the village of Saint-Leu d'Esserent. Although the rebellion linked to a revolt led by Étienne Marcel in Paris, the Jacquerie was a distinct, peasant-led movement that arose in the Beauvaisis which spread to implicate Picardy, some of Normandy, Champagne and the southern Île-de-France. These peasant bands attacked surrounding houses, many of which were only occupied by women and children, the men being with an army gathering to recapture Paris from Marcel's rebellion. While some occupants were killed, the bulk of the rebellion's violence was focused on destroying noble houses and fortifications and looting or destroying their contents.

The nobles’ response was furious. Nobles from across northern France sought help in Normandy from King Charles II of Navarre, some of whose troops were English mercenaries. This army moved into the Beauvais, preparing to strike at the peasants who had set up camp near Mello. Another army, 800-strong under Jean Vaillant and Pierre Gilles, was dispatched from Paris to Meaux, where they besieged the castle of Marché which contained Lady Jeanne de Bourbon, the wife of the Dauphin Charles and his daughter Jeanne, along with a large number of nobles. According to the chronicler Froissart, they were joined by Count Gaston Phoebus and Lord Jean III de Grailly returning from crusading with the Teutonic Knights .

The armies were composed very differently: the peasant army under the leadership of Guillaume Cale reportedly numbered 4,000 peasants and seem to have included no participation from the Parisian forces, while the army at Meaux had a core of nearly 1,000 Parisian troops, sent by Étienne Marcel, and a large number of Jacques and other villagers who had been pressed into service by the Parisian commanders along the way. The motives of the latter for joining the uprising were mixed. Some were subsequently to claim that they acted under duress.

== Battle ==
On the morning of 10 June 1358, the peasant army was lined up on the hillside near Mello, archers in the front rank, infantry behind them and cavalry forming an emergency reserve. The position was a strong one and the force of nobles, being weaker in numbers than their opponents, would have had difficulties in breaking through the peasant army's lines had the situation remained the same. However, Charles of Navarre had a plan to deal with the peasant leader Guillaume Cale before hostilities began, thus cutting the head off his opponent's army. A message was dispatched inviting Cale for treaty talks with the leader of the noble army, inviting the rebels to disperse unharmed. Cale was offered safe-passage through the noble-led army for the talks and agreed. Once he entered the noble lines he was seized and thrown in irons. That evening he was tortured to death and the remnants of his army were scattered. The medieval codes of chivalry did not apparently apply to peasant leaders.

With their leader gone, the peasant army's morale plummeted and their line fell apart, allowing a cavalry charge to break through their centre. This caused the peasants to break into a shapeless mass. This mass was then systematically exterminated, the charge led by Charles of Navarre. Significantly, even against such inferior opposition, the main body of the French noble army fought on foot demonstrating that they had learnt the lesson of the ineffectiveness of cavalry against archers in a secure position taught at the Battle of Crécy twelve years before. Many of the peasants were hunted down and killed on the spot, or later in great mass executions by beheading, hanging or even more violent deaths.

== Battle of Meaux ==
The second engagement of the battle was fought simultaneously in the town of Meaux, where the garrison of the castle of Marché was preparing for an assault. Realising that the peasant army was not prepared for a conventional battle in the streets of the town, the two dozen soldiers in the keep sallied out on horseback. The peasant army had been feasting with the sympathetic townsfolk the night before, and were still hazy from their excesses when the cavalry hit their packed ranks. The Parisian forces fought hardest before breaking, but within minutes the entire army was nothing but a panicked rabble blocking every street away from the castle. They were joined by the town's populace, who also feared vengeance for their support of the peasants, and the cavalry simply hacked their way through the masses, killing dozens if not hundreds of people for the loss of just one of their own. When the peasants had been driven out the entire town was razed to the ground as punishment for disloyalty.

== Aftermath ==
Refugees from the Jacquerie army and Meaux spread out across the countryside where they were exterminated along with thousands of other peasants, many innocent of any involvement in the rebellion, by the vengeful nobles and their mercenary allies. Villages were burnt, crops destroyed and families executed, reducing a valuable farming area into a wasteland as revenge. The Beauvais and many unaffected surrounding areas were thus blighted for decades to come. The Paris Jacquerie collapsed without the support of the food producing peasants in the countryside, and the entire area was within noble control again by the end of the year.
