= Guillaume Cale =

14th-century French peasant rebel leader

William Kale
- Guillaume Cale
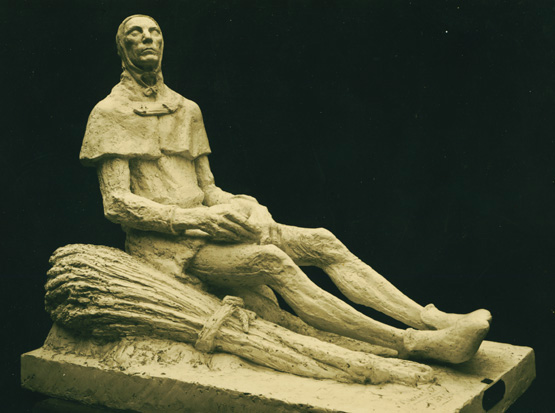
- Plaster statue of Kale by the sculptor Victor Nicolas, 1934
- Born: Picardy, Kingdom of France
- Died: 1358; Clermont, Kingdom of France
- Cause of death: Execution
- Other name: Jack Goodfellow
- Military career
- Conflict: Jacquerie
- Battle: Mello

Guillaume Cale (sometimes anglicized to William Kale, also known as Guillaume Caillet, popularly known as Jacques Bonhomme ("Jack Goodfellow") or Callet) was a peasant from the village of Mello near Beauvais, who became leader of the peasant Jacquerie which broke out in May 1358 and continued for a month unchecked until the Battle of Mello on 10 June. Cale's origins are unknown; it is not clear how old he was at the time of the uprising, nor is anything known about his family and business ties, except that he was a reasonably well-off farmer.

In 1358 the Beauvais was perhaps the only region of France that had remained unaffected by twenty years of warfare with England. It was still prosperous despite the impact of the Black Death, and maintained its wealth under the protection of the household troops of the French king and the other nobles who lived in and around Paris, depending on the region for food and for taxation income. However, in 1356, King John II was captured by the English at the Battle of Poitiers. His exorbitant ransom began to drain the already depleted French treasury, and the authority exercised by the nobility diminished. In the spring of 1358, violence broke out in Paris, as a clothier named Étienne Marcel seized the city with an army of townsmen, drove out the Dauphin and formed a revolutionary commune, presided over by Marcel.

Cale was sympathetic to the Parisians, and so when a similar rebellion began to ferment in the Beauvais region, he became its leader, forming bands of peasants, villagers and brigands into a fairly cohesive, though ill-equipped, force. Cale and his supporters were able to overcome the scattered opposition from noble bodyguards and retainers and take control of the region. Loosely organized, the rebel bands ran amok, killing hundreds of nobles, retainers, and their wives and families amid scenes of brutality. Cale was joined by contingents from the towns of Senlis, Clermont and Creil and eventually could field 5,000 men, including several minor nobles, whose military experience gave his force structure.

Cale conducted a campaign of reduction against local castles and forts designed to give his army more mobility, and his troops were substantial enough that they were able to menace local towns into feeding them under threat of destruction. The rebellion spread all around Paris, and it was said flames could be seen from the walls on all sides. Amongst the castles taken was a royal dwelling at Montmorency, which was burnt to the ground.

On 7 June, just a few weeks after the uprising began, Cale drew his forces up on a hill near his hometown of Mello and awaited the arrival of a force of nobles and mercenaries commanded by King Charles II of Navarre, which had been despatched to crush the rebellion. In an attempt to distract the advancing force, Cale sent 800 men to Meaux, where the Dauphin was sheltering with his family. Dauphin Charles fled, leaving his wife and daughter to be besieged in the castle of Marché. This did not however divert the King of Navarre, whose force arrived on 10 June. Promising safe passage, Charles of Navarre offered Cale a chance to discuss treaty terms in his camp, an opportunity Cale accepted. He left his lines, having prepared an efficient defense and entered the lines of the opposing forces. Charles did not, however, keep to his word and Cale was seized. The army of Jacques was destroyed in the ensuing Battle of Mello.

Cale was taken in irons to Clermont where, following torture, he was beheaded in the town square, along with some of the remnants of his army. (Some accounts offer that he was tortured to death by being crowned with a red-hot crown.)

The Jacquerie was destroyed and major reprisals were undertaken against the peasants who had threatened the severely classist social order of medieval France.
