= 1340 =

1340 in various calendars
- Gregorian calendar: 1340; MCCCXL
- Ab urbe condita: 2093
- Armenian calendar: 789; ԹՎ ՉՁԹ
- Assyrian calendar: 6090
- Balinese saka calendar: 1261–1262
- Bengali calendar: 746–747
- Berber calendar: 2290
- English Regnal year: 13 Edw. 3 – 14 Edw. 3
- Buddhist calendar: 1884
- Burmese calendar: 702
- Byzantine calendar: 6848–6849
- Chinese calendar: 己卯年 (Earth Rabbit); 4037 or 3830 — to — 庚辰年 (Metal Dragon); 4038 or 3831
- Coptic calendar: 1056–1057
- Discordian calendar: 2506
- Ethiopian calendar: 1332–1333
- Hebrew calendar: 5100–5101
- Hindu calendars
- Vikram Samvat: 1396–1397
- Shaka Samvat: 1261–1262
- Kali Yuga: 4440–4441
- Holocene calendar: 11340
- Igbo calendar: 340–341
- Iranian calendar: 718–719
- Islamic calendar: 740–741
- Japanese calendar: Ryakuō 3 (暦応３年)
- Javanese calendar: 1252–1253
- Julian calendar: 1340; MCCCXL
- Korean calendar: 3673
- Minguo calendar: 572 before ROC 民前572年
- Nanakshahi calendar: −128
- Thai solar calendar: 1882–1883
- Tibetan calendar: ས་མོ་ཡོས་ལོ་ (female Earth-Hare); 1466 or 1085 or 313 — to — ལྕགས་ཕོ་འབྲུག་ལོ་ (male Iron-Dragon); 1467 or 1086 or 314

Year 1340 (MCCCXL) was a leap year starting on Saturday of the Julian calendar.

== Events ==
- January 26 – King Edward III of England declares himself King of France at Ghent, Flanders.
- March 6 – Bohemian Crusade: The Church authorizes a military expedition against heretics.
- April 8 – Marinid galleys, under the command of Muhammad ibn Ali al-Azafi, rout the Castellan fleet, off the coast of Algeciras.
- April–July – Trapezuntine Civil War: An abortive uprising occurs against Irene Palaiologina of Trebizond, the first of a number of coups, revolts, and succession disputes.
- June 7 – Rotterdam is officially declared a city.
- June 24
  - Hundred Years' War: Battle of Sluys – The English fleet, under the command of Edward III of England, battles the French fleet, under that of Admiral Hugues Quiéret and treasurer Nicolas Béhuchet, assisted by Genoese mercenary galleys under Egidio Bocanegra, on the Low Countries coast. The French fleet is virtually destroyed, and both of its commanders are killed.
  - Valdemar IV of Denmark, son of deceased King Christopher II, is elected to the throne, following 8 years of interregnum.
- July 26 – Hundred Years' War – Battle of Saint-Omer: The French defeat the English.
- September 25 – Hundred Years' War: The temporary Truce of Espléchin is signed between England and France.
- October 30 – Battle of Río Salado in Spain: The kings of Castile and Portugal defeat the Nasrid ruler of Granada and his Moroccan allies.

=== Date unknown ===
- Europe has about 74 million inhabitants.
- An epidemic in northern Italy is recorded by Augustine of Trent, in his Epistola astrologica.
- The Monarchy of Japan reaches its 2,000 year anniversary (according to traditional starting dates).

== Births ==
- March 5 – Cansignorio della Scala, Lord of Verona (d. 1375)
- March 6 – John of Gaunt, 1st Duke of Lancaster (d. 1399)
- August – Haakon VI, king of Norway 1355–1380 and of Sweden 1362–1364 (d. 1380)
- October – Geert Groote, Dutch founder of the Brethren of the Common Life (d. 1384)
- November 30 – John, Duke of Berry, son of John II of France (d. 1416)
- date unknown
  - Enguerrand VII, Lord of Coucy (d. 1397)
  - John of Nepomuk, saint of Bohemia (d. 1393)
  - Narayana Pandit, Indian mathematician (d. 1400)
- probable
  - Margaret Drummond, queen consort of Scotland (d. 1375)
  - Philip van Artevelde, Flemish patriot (d. 1382)

== Deaths ==
- March 31 – Ivan I of Moscow (b. 1288)
- April 5 – William Melton, English archbishop
- April 6 – Emperor Basil Megas Komnenos of Trebizond
- April 7 – Bolesław Jerzy II of Mazovia (b. 1308)
- December 2 – Geoffrey le Scrope, Chief Justice of King Edward III of England
- December 4 – Henry Burghersh, English bishop and chancellor (b. 1292)
- December 20 – John I, Duke of Bavaria (b. 1329)
- date unknown – Simonida, queen consort of Serbia (b. 1294)
- date unknown – Friedrich von Pernstein, Archbishop of Riga
