= Great Ordinance of 1357 =

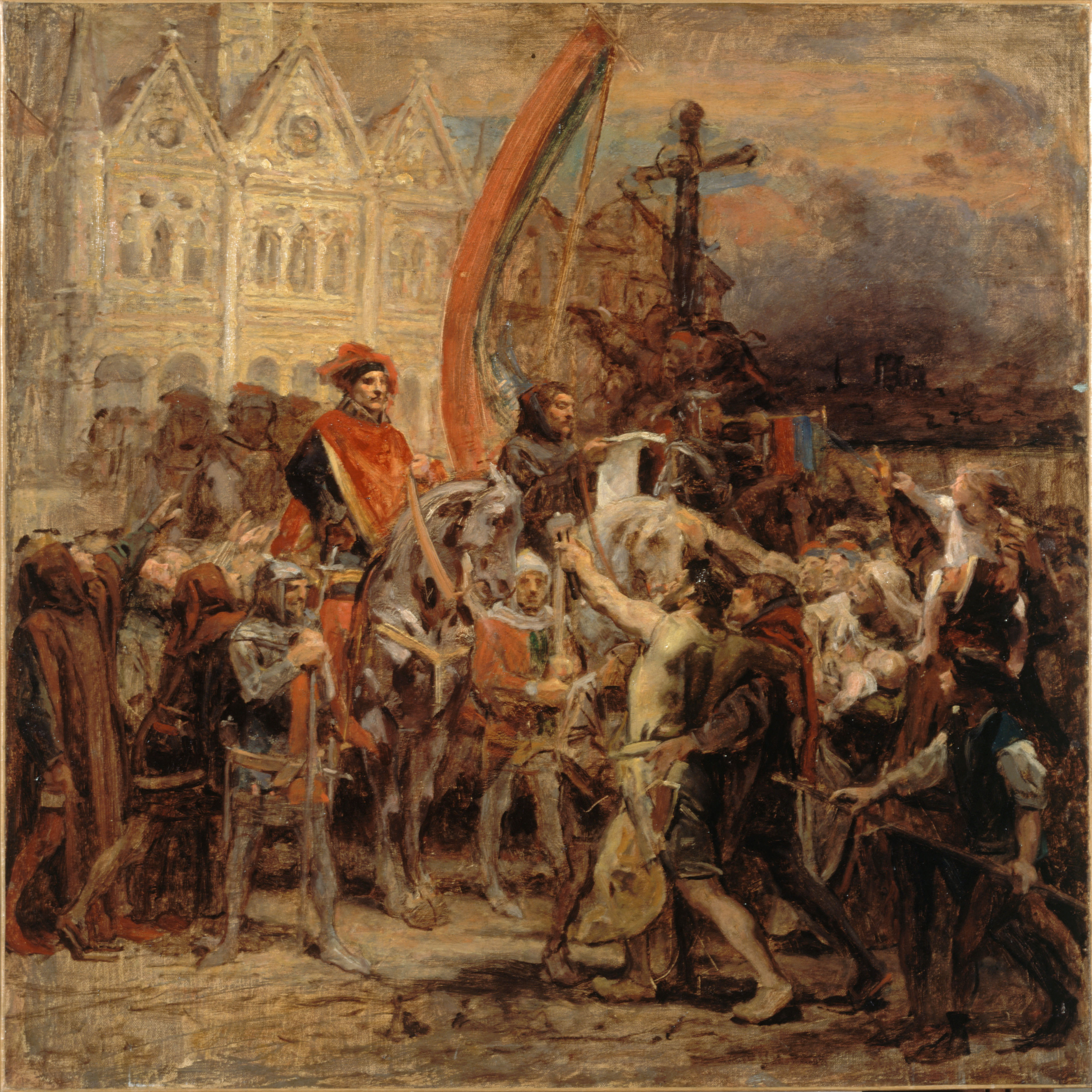
Diogène Maillart, Sketch for a painting, Etienne Marcel and the Grand Ordinance of 1357

The Great Ordinance of 1357 was an edict through which Étienne Marcel attempted to impose limits on the French monarchy, in particular in fiscal and monetary matters.

== Historical context ==
Since the year 1000 and the Cluny renaissance, medieval society had evolved considerably. Europe had made great technical, artistic and demographic advances. Towns had developed, creating new social classes centred on the trades and commerce. Just as agricultural society had adapted to a feudal and religious system where nobility protected the lands and dispensed justice, so the new classes of craftsmen and merchants needed to be free to develop their business enterprises. With more and more matters of state to attend to, kings and their lords could no longer rule alone, and had to delegate part of their judicial powers to parliaments and other courts of justice.

In England, the setbacks that John (considered as illegitimate and as usurping the throne from his brother Richard the Lionheart) faced against the Dauphin (heir apparent) led city-dwellers in 1215 to impose the Magna Carta on the king, a charter that instituted liberty for the cities and parliamentary checks on royal taxation. In France the Capetians held onto their power while favoring the development of strong cities as a counterbalance to strong (often over-strong) nobles. Starting with Philip IV, this was done by favouring the development of villes franches (towns granted special franchises), and by consulting with legislative assemblies known as States-General for making important decisions. In fact, the royal domain was considerably extended and most of the dukedoms progressively became appanages entrusted to the king's sons, avoiding the progressive division of the Capetians' possessions.

In France, the outset of the Hundred Years' War had been catastrophic and royal power was greatly contested after the defeat at Crécy in 1346. In effect, Philip VI was enthroned to the detriment of Edward III thanks to a series of legal technicalities. In the same way, Charles II of Navarre (called "Charles the Bad") was a pretender to the throne, his mother Jeanne having been removed in order to avoid a powerful foreigner taking control of France by marriage. In this era the nobility justified the divine essence of its power by chivalrous conduct, especially on the battlefield. Thus, Crécy was a disaster against a very numerically inferior army and Philip VI fled, calling into question the divine legitimacy of the Valois. This disrepute was worsened by the appearance of the Black Death in 1348, supporting the idea that this dynasty was not supported by God. Edward III and Charles of Navarre therefore saw their chance to emphasize their respective claims to the crown of France and attempted to win over the cities then losing hope in the institution of a controlled monarchy.

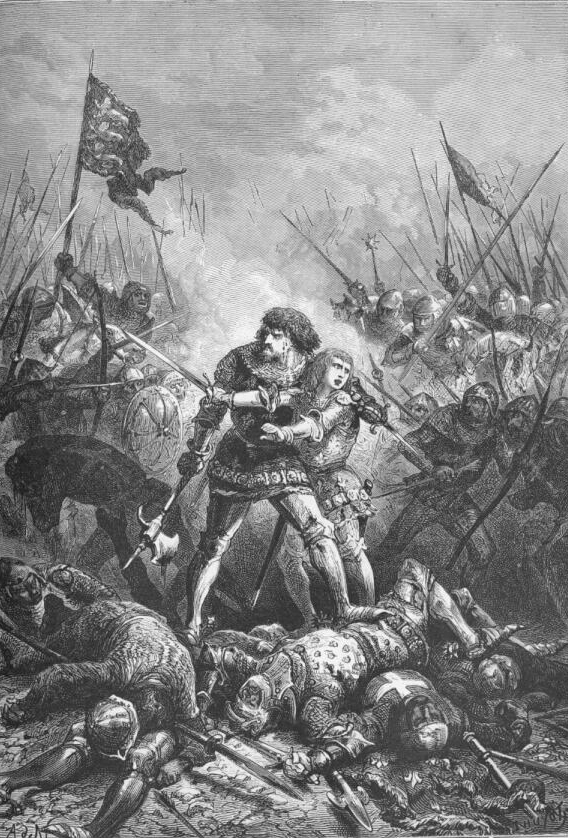
The heroism of John the Good and of his son Philip at the Battle of Poitiers remains famous and led to Philip's nickname the Bold.

In 1356, at the Battle of Poitiers, King John the Good - not wanting to flee as his father had after Crécy - fought heroically and was captured by the English, but acquired an enormous prestige. His son, and Dauphin, Charles, who was able to leave the battlefield, assumed the regency and attempted to negotiate with England. The grandes compagnies (demobilized mercenary soldiers) pillaged the countryside, and to counteract them the Dauphin suggested a permanent army of 30,000 men. To raise such an army, he had to raise taxes, and so he summoned the States-General.

== The States-General ==
Étienne Marcel, provost of the merchants of Paris became head of the Third State in the States-General of 1355 and 1356. In 1355 the Hundred Years' War reignited, and John the Good had to convene the States-General to finance his army of 30,000 men necessary to defend France. They were extremely suspicious of the question of public finances (angered by the devaluations brought about by repeated monetary changes), and would only accept a rise in the salt tax (the gabelle) if the States-General were able to control the application and the usage of the funds raised by it. The officers who would raise the tax had to be designated by the States-General, and ten representatives had to be on the king's counsel of the king in order to check the finances. This ordinance was ratified on 28 December 1355.

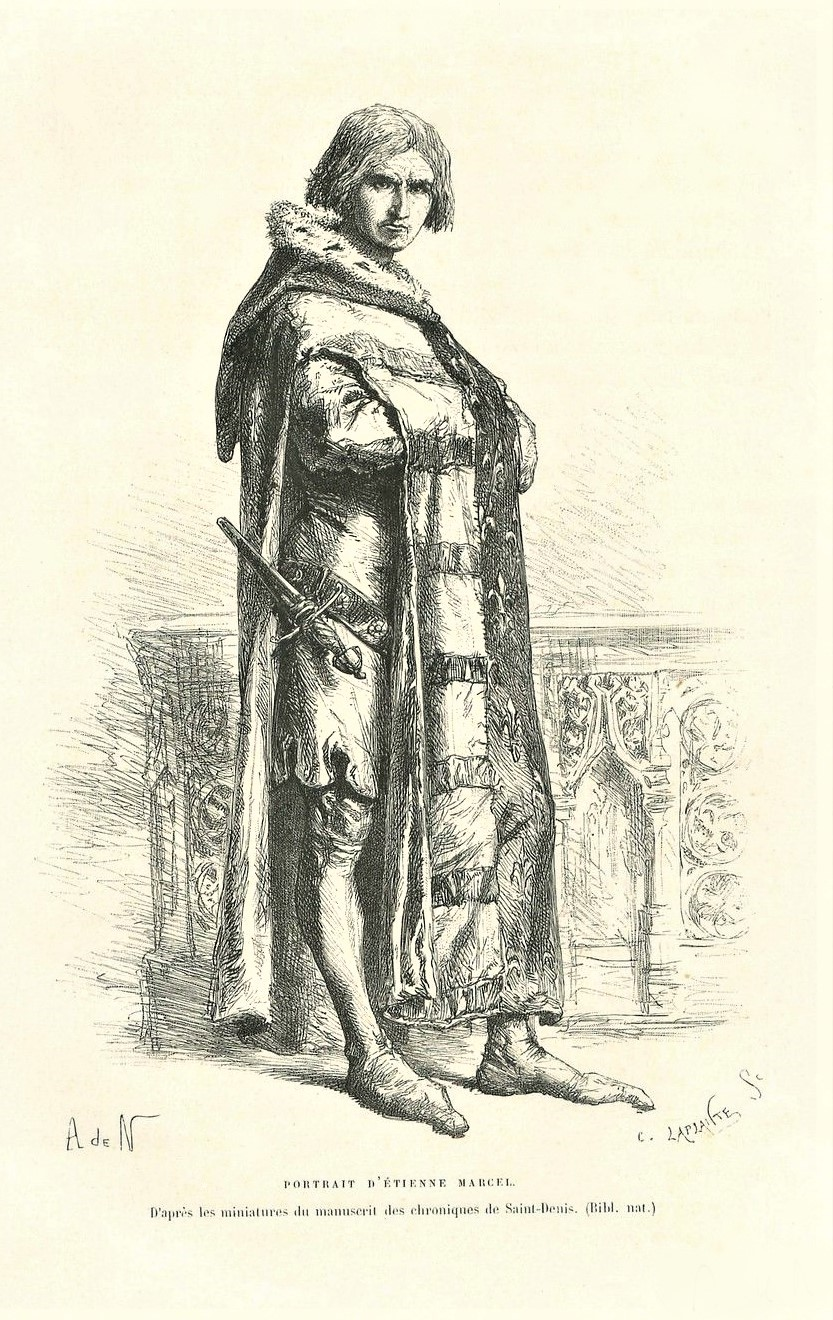
Étienne Marcel, Illustration from the 19th century.

The Battle of Poitiers occurred on the 19 September 1356. In a new disaster for France, John II came close to victory but he and one of his young sons, Philip the Bold, were captured.

The beginnings of the Dauphin Charles's regency were fraught with difficulty: only 18, with little experience or personal prestige (unlike his father and brother he had quit the field of battle at Poitiers), and carrying the shame of the Valois dynasty on his shoulders. He surrounded himself by greatly discredited members of his father's royal counsel.

On his arrival in Paris, 10 days after the battle, he called a meeting of the States-General of the langues d'oïl to be convened on 17 October 1356. The deputies of the Third Estate numbered 400. The Dauphin faced a strong opposition - Étienne Marcel headed the Bourgeoisie and the friends of Charles of Navarre regrouped around Robert le Coq, Bishop of Laon. Within the States-General, a committee of 80 members, formed on its own initiative to facilitate discussions, supported their claims. The States-General declared the Dauphin the king's lieutenant and defender of the kingdom in his father's absence and assigned him a counsel of twenty men (twelve nobles, twelve bourgeois and four clerks) as foreseen by the order of 1355.

Étienne Marcel sought to reform the government and the administration of the kingdom. In return for allowing the king to raise new taxes, he demanded the discharge of the seven most compromised counselors and the freeing of the King of Navarre. On these conditions, the states were disposed to vote for the period of one year the Dauphin an aid of a décime and a half on all the three orders' revenues. Not powerful enough to refuse these suggestions straight away, the Dauphin postponed his response (on the pretext of waiting for messengers from his father)), dissolved the States-General and left Paris for Metz to render homage to his maternal uncle emperor Charles IV. But, lacking money, he soon found himself at the mercy of Marcel, who had seized upon the indignation provoked by a new ordinance to change the currency (published on 10 December 1356) and caused all the corporations to take up arms; the Dauphin had to accept the dismissal of his counsellors, cancel the currency change and recall the States-General, to meet at the start of February 1357. On 3 March, after stormy debates, the Dauphin accepted the promulgation of the major "grande ordonnance" that had been voted for on 28 December during the States-General of 1355 and that his father had ratified just before departing to fight the English in summer 1356.

== The ordinance ==
The text of this ordinance consisted of 61 articles. Less rigorous than that of December 1355, it sketched out a controlled monarchy and a vast plan of administrative reorganization. It specified that a purging commission of twenty-eight representatives, of which twelve would be bourgeois, would be put in charge of discharging faulty officials (particularly the collectors of particularly unpopular taxes). Guilty officials would then be condemned and their wills confiscated. The Dauphin renounced all impositions not voted on by the States-General and accepted the creation of a 36-strong counsel of guardianship that immediately started to put in place reforming measures. Six representatives of the States-General entered the king's counsel, which became the counsel of guardianship, to oversee the royal administration closely: finances and particularly the monetary changes and extraordinary subsidies were to be checked by the States-General. The ordinance also foresaw a fixed currency, no tax exemption for the nobility, the abolition of lords' right of requisition, and the taking of forage and horses sheltered from pillaging. In exchange for these measures the cities would furnish one soldier for every hundred homes. Five days after the ordinance was promulgated, almost all those who were royal counselors at that moment were exiled, the members of Parlement and of the Chamber of Accounts had their posts renewed, the officers of justice and of finances were discharged, and a court of appeal created.

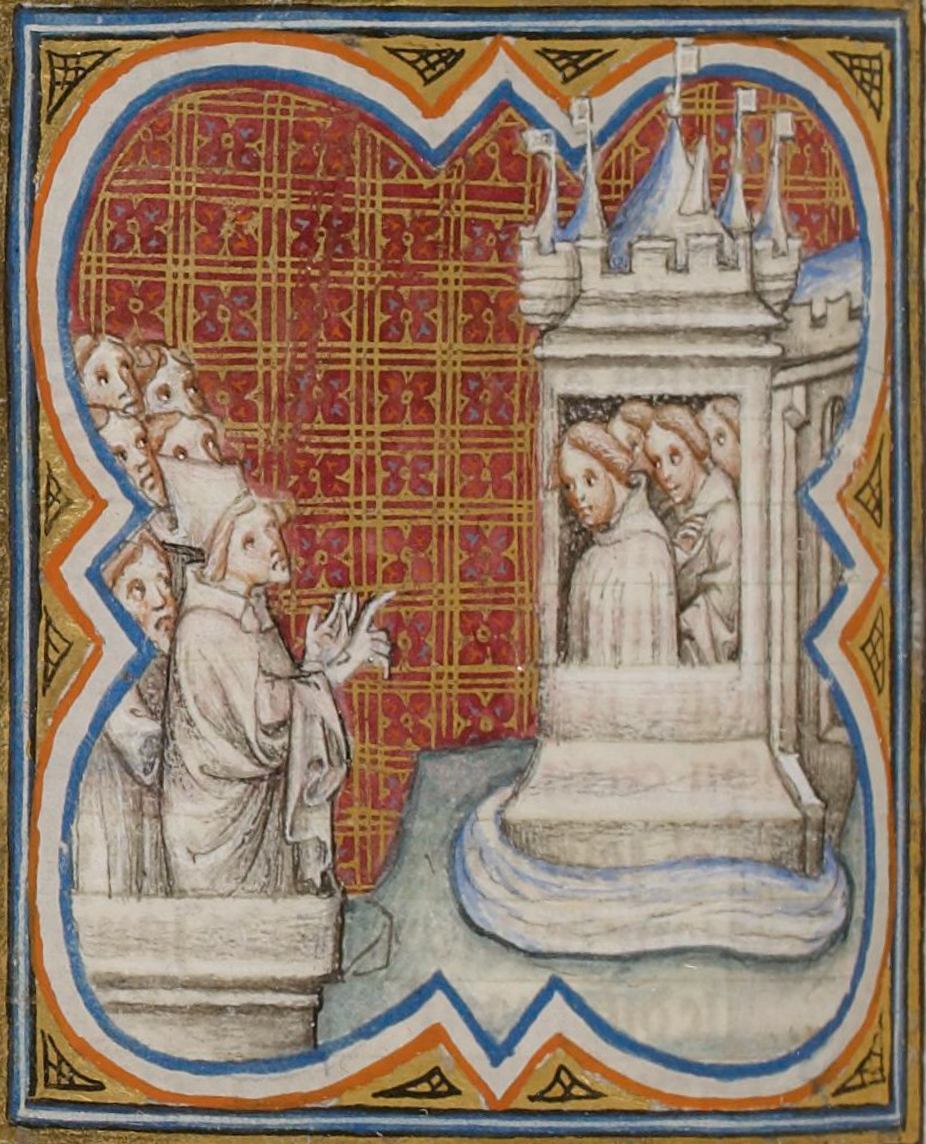
Robert Le Coq, bishop of Laon. From the 14th century Grandes Chroniques de France.

However, the full execution of this ordinance was quickly blocked. The purging committee was set up but only functioned for 5 months. The tax collectors named by the States-General met with hostility from peasants and poor craftsmen. The six representatives on the guardianship counsel were in a minority and the States-General lacked the political experience to keep a permanent check on the Dauphin's strength, as he took advice and rediscovered his officials' support. The frequent displacements, costly and dangerous in this era, discouraged the provinces' representatives, and the states became less and less representative. Little by little, only the Parisian middle class came to sit in the assemblies. But at last, the King, John the Good, keeping a good reputation and signing a two-year truce with the prosecutors of the Prince of Wales, disavowed the Dauphin and, from his prison at Bordeaux, on 6 April 1357 banned the reforming ordinance from being applied. Étienne Marcel and Robert le Coq protested to the Dauphin who, feeling confident in his support from the provinces (the provinces were not following the Parisian population's course of action), in the month of August forbade Marcel and his adherents from taking any part in government and announced that he would rule alone. Le Coq withdrew to his diocese; but Marcel remained at Paris, and took advantage of the Dauphin's departure (who had left to call the States-General together outside the capital) to organize resistance. From then on he planned to oppose the reigning branch of the Valois family, another part of the royal, and found in the person of the King of Navarre, Charles the Bad, already claiming the French throne. A "coup de main" arranged by Marcel enabled the King of Navarre to escape the castle of Ailleux where he was held, and the Dauphin returning to Paris without money, had to once again convene the States-General for 7 November; under pressure from the heads of the people, he granted his brother-in-law one safe conduct and authorization to return to Paris. On 13 January 1358, the States-General reassembled, but almost no nobles and very few churchmen attended. The representatives departed without having been able to come to an agreement on how to find subsidies. The following 23 January, the Dauphin prescribed an order authorizing the States-General to devalue the currency. Étienne Marcel, noting the failure of his attempts to control the monarchy by legislation, proclaimed he would attempt to control it by force. It does not put back in cause the necessity to have a sovereign one, but it must compose with the one that will leave to him the more of strength. He did question the necessity of a sovereign, but it had to be composed with those who would most check his power. He oscillated between the supposed weakness of the Dauphin and the avarice of Charles the Bad.
