= Jean de Venette =

French historian

- Born: Jean de Venette c. 1307; Venette, Fr.
- Died: aft. 1370
- Occupations: French Chronicler; Carmelite friar

Jean de Venette, or Jean Fillons (c. 1307 – c. 1370) was a French Carmelite friar, from Venette, Oise, who became the Prior of the Carmelite monastery in the Place Maubert, Paris, and was a Provincial Superior of France from 1341 to 1366. He is the author of L'Histoire des Trois Maries, a long French poem on the legend of the Three Marys, giving his name at the start of the text, and has since 1735 been also regarded as the author of an anonymous Latin chronicle of the period of the Hundred Years' War between England and France. In recent decades it has been questioned whether these were in fact the same author, although it seems that both were Carmelites. Other historians see no reason to create an extra author, but recent French publications tend to refer to the "Chronique dite de Jean de Venette" ("Chronicle said to be by Jean de Venette"). By his own account the chronicler was of peasant origin, and his view of the events of his lifetime has a significantly different perspective from that of other chroniclers.

== The Chronicle ==
The Chronicle is a narrative of several historical events spanning the years of 1340 and 1368, written as early as 1340, until Jean de Venette's death at or soon after the year 1368. When it was first published in the Spicilegium, vol. 3, it was included as the "second continuation" of the popular earlier chronicle of William of Nangis (died 1300). This survived in a number of manuscripts, but it was later realized that one MS British Library MS Arundel 28, contains only Venette's chronicle, in a version with significant differences to those appended elsewhere to Nangis' work. This manuscript was later translated into English by Jean Birdsall, and was published as The Chronicle of Jean de Venette in 1953, edited and annotated by Richard A. Newhall, Brown Professor of European History, Williams College. Newhall and Birdsall's contention that the Arundel MS contains a text closer to Venette's original than other versions has been generally accepted.

As many of the portions were recorded contemporaneously and in a chronological fashion, it gives a very reliable first hand account of several historical events. The evidence seems to indicate a dual authorship from 1340 to 1368. During the years 1358-1359 the entries were contemporary with the events recorded; the earlier portion of the work, if it was begun as early as 1340, was subjected to revision later, though Venette himself states on the first page of his chronicle (1340) he is recording events "...in great measure as I have seen and heard them."

The Chronicle begins in the year 1340 at which time Venette talks about the revelations of a (unnamed) priest who was held prisoner by the Saracens for 13 years and freed in 1309, who foretold of a vision of a great famine which would occur in 1315 and other horrible things which were to happen thereafter. Venette states that he was seven or eight in this year and indeed the famine did occur exactly as predicted and lasted two years. He then tells the background of the fight for the crown of France after the death of Philip the Fair and the claims of Edward I of England to that throne, thus describing the background to the beginning of the Hundred Years' War. His history is detailed and precise. He also describes the Battle of Crecy in 1356, The Peasant's War, and the siege of Calais, again with great detail.

According to one scholar, "Venette is not a first-class chronicler. He is often inaccurate or muddled, and there are few matters of real importance for which he is our sole or principal authority. The interest of the chronicle lies in the fact that it is the work of an intelligent and not uncritical observer, well placed to witness great and often tragic events, who provides a useful corrective to Froissart's aristocratic romanticism and is quite uninfluenced by the official Valois version of affairs, the version preserved by the Saint Denis chroniclers and still largely accepted by French historians."

== Background ==
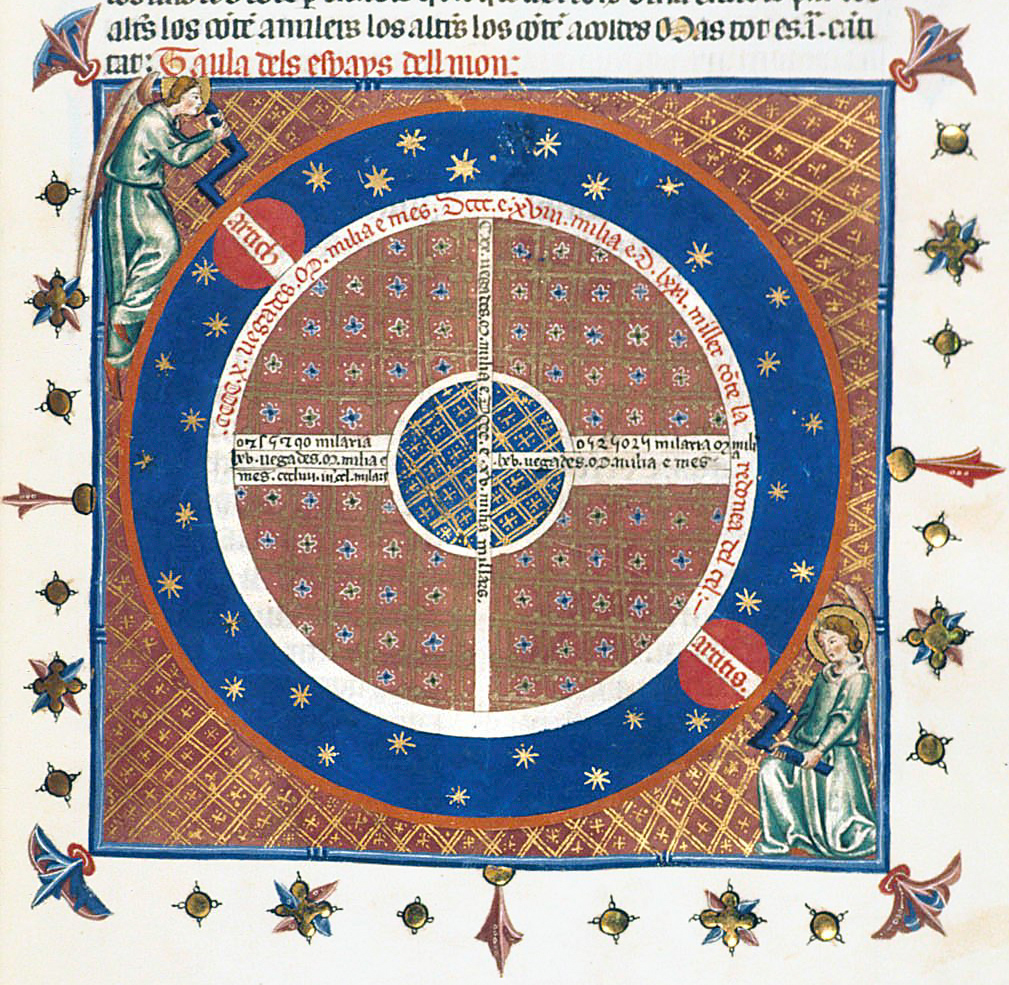
Fourteenth-century drawing of angels turning the celestial spheres

Venette had a master in theology from the University of Paris and spent a great deal of his time promoting study among the younger members of the Carmelites, and he gathered information on the earlier history of the Carmelite Order going all the way back to Elijah, its founder. Venette regarded ignorance as the cause of many of the problems of his time, including the Black Death, and encouraged many of the Carmelites to learn to read and write.

What is noteworthy and perhaps unique about Venette's work is that he had a great understanding and sympathy for the peasants. Most chroniclers wrote from the perspective of the nobles. It is possible his own humble beginnings afforded him a unique understanding of the hard life of these peasants. His work covers many important events of the fourteenth century including the Black Death, the Hundred Years' War, and The Peasant's War.

== Formulation of beliefs ==
Venette first and foremost followed the teachings of the Pope. No matter the person or the circumstances, he did not deviate from his religious beliefs and criticised anyone who was Excommunicate or otherwise not following the teachings of God. Venette combines his religious belief with astronomical events. He quotes and agrees with the interpretation of Master Jean de Murs and others made before and during this time. It is clear that he (as did other monastic chroniclers and monastic astronomers) attributes these signs as a "warning" from God that punishment was coming for man's sinful nature. In 1340, he speaks of a comet that appeared in that year. This comet is also described by Augustine of Trent who blamed it for an epidemic that was occurring in Italy at the time. Due to his many references in the Chronicle, it is almost certain that Venette agreed with Augustine. Another comet, still unidentified, was said to appear in August 1348 which Venette himself sees. This comet is referred to by Mike Baillie as "Comet Negra" in his book New Light on the Black Death. Venette also refers to passages from the Book of Revelation to try to understand and explain the chaos in and around him.

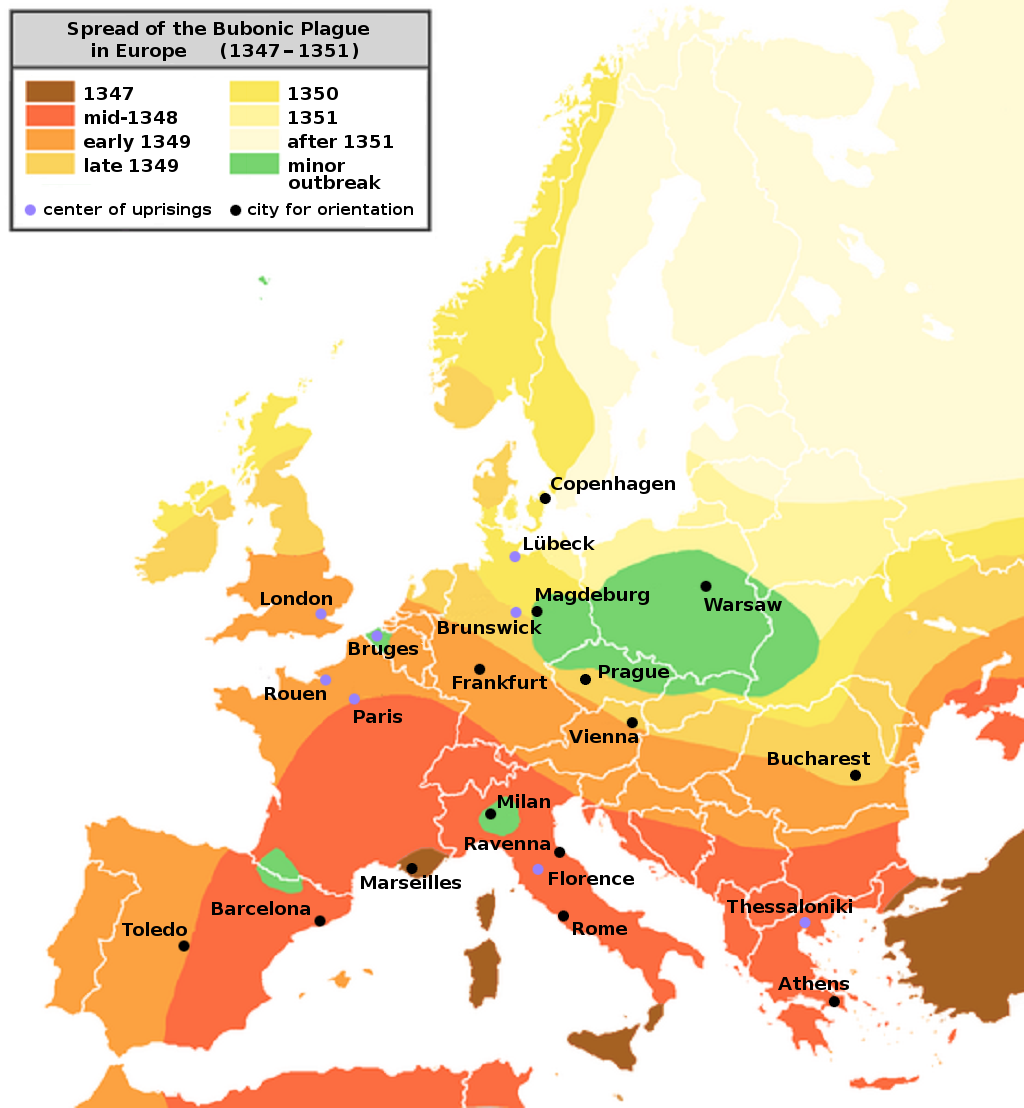
The spread of the Black Death (with modern borders)

== The Plague ==
The Black Death was a devastating disease which first appeared in Europe in 1348. Where it originated from is still debated but Venette attributes its origin to the "unbelievers". According to Venette and others, within a short time, over 500 dead per day were being buried. It lasted approximately one year but returned in later years. While Venette observes how many "timid" priests did not do their religious duty to visit the dying and administer the Last Sacraments, he adds that the Sisters of the Hôtel-Dieu "not fearing to die, nursed the sick in all sweetness and humility and many of them died themselves from the plague".

== The Hundred Years' War ==
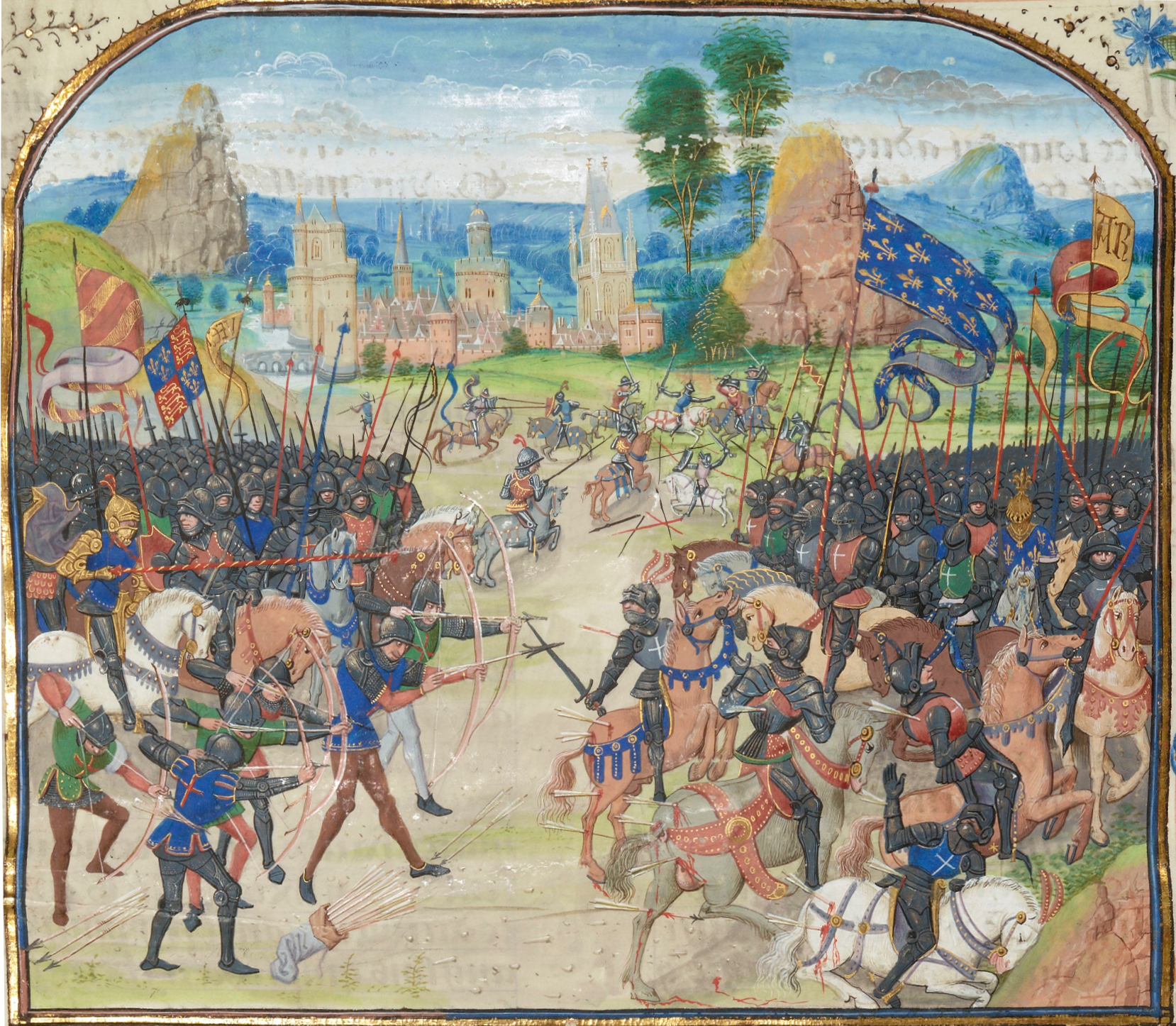
Battle of Poitiers 1356 shown here in a miniature from Froissart's Chronicles

Venette vividly describes several battles of the Hundred Years' War such as the Battle of Crecy, the siege of Calais and the Battle of Poitiers.

Of the Battle of Crecy, he places the time and day on "Saint Louis's Day, 1346, at the end of the ninth hour". He mentions the failure of the Genoese crossbows to function, he states they were useless because they were wet and not given time to dry out. He states that the French King ordered the massacre of the crossbowmen because of what he conceived as cowardice. He blames this and the further disorder and confusion of the French on the "undue haste" of the French King. He describes the English longbowmans' arrows as "rain coming from heaven and the sky's which were formerly clear, suddenly darkened".

Venette was known as a child of the people and, until later in his life, he consistently acknowledged the power of the monarchy. He does not, however, hesitate to criticise the nobles for their failure to protect the people, particularly after the Battle of Poitiers in 1356 at which time the King of France and his son were taken hostage and held for an enormous ransom.

After the Battle of Poiters, many of the nobles and the "Companies" were ravaging the different towns and cities, pillaging and raping. Of that time Venette states:

Thus discord and all three estates abandoned the task they had begun. From that time on, all went ill with the kingdom and the State was undone. Thieves and robbers rose up everywhere in the land. The Nobles despised and hated all others and took no thought for usefulness and profit of lord and men. They subjected and despoiled the peasants and the men of the villages. In no wise did they defend their country from its enemies; rather did they trample it underfoot, robbing and pillaging the peasants' goods. The regent, it appeared, clearly gave no thought to their plight. At that time the country and the whole land of France began to be put in confusion and mourning like a garment, because it had no defender or guardian.

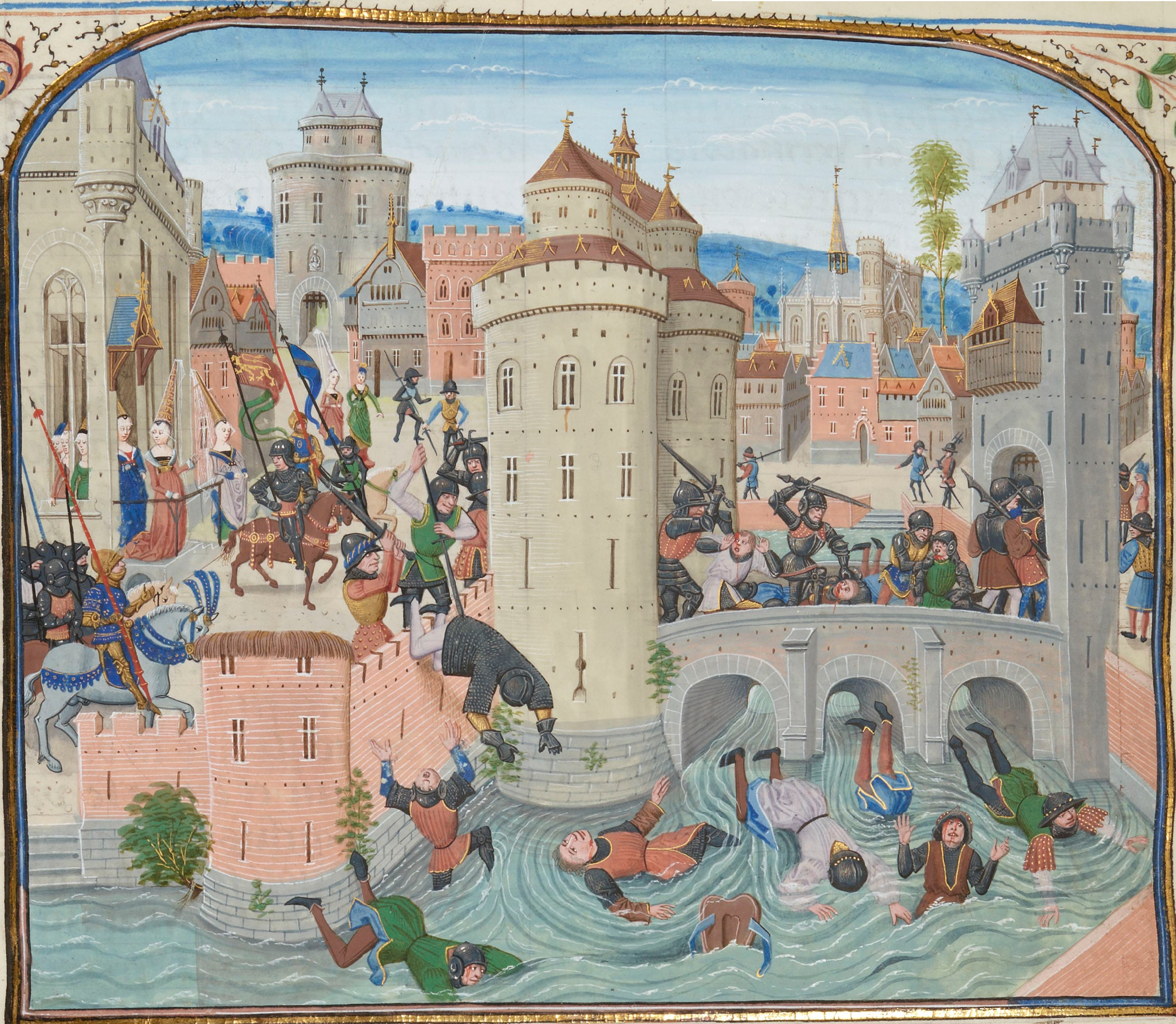
Defeat of the Jacquerie shown here in a miniature from Froissart's Chronicles

Venette is referring here not only to the French Nobles, but to the Companies who also plundered the peasants and Churches.

== The Peasant's War ==
Venette also speaks about the Peasant's War (part of the Hundred Years' War) in France. In one particular account, he tells of how a group of French peasants, led by Guillaume l'Aloue, defeated the English in several skirmishes. After the capture of the French King by the English during the Battle of Poitiers in September 1356, power in France devolved fruitlessly among the States General, Charles the Bad, King of Navarre, and John's son, the Dauphin, later Charles V.

== L'Histoire des trois Maries ==
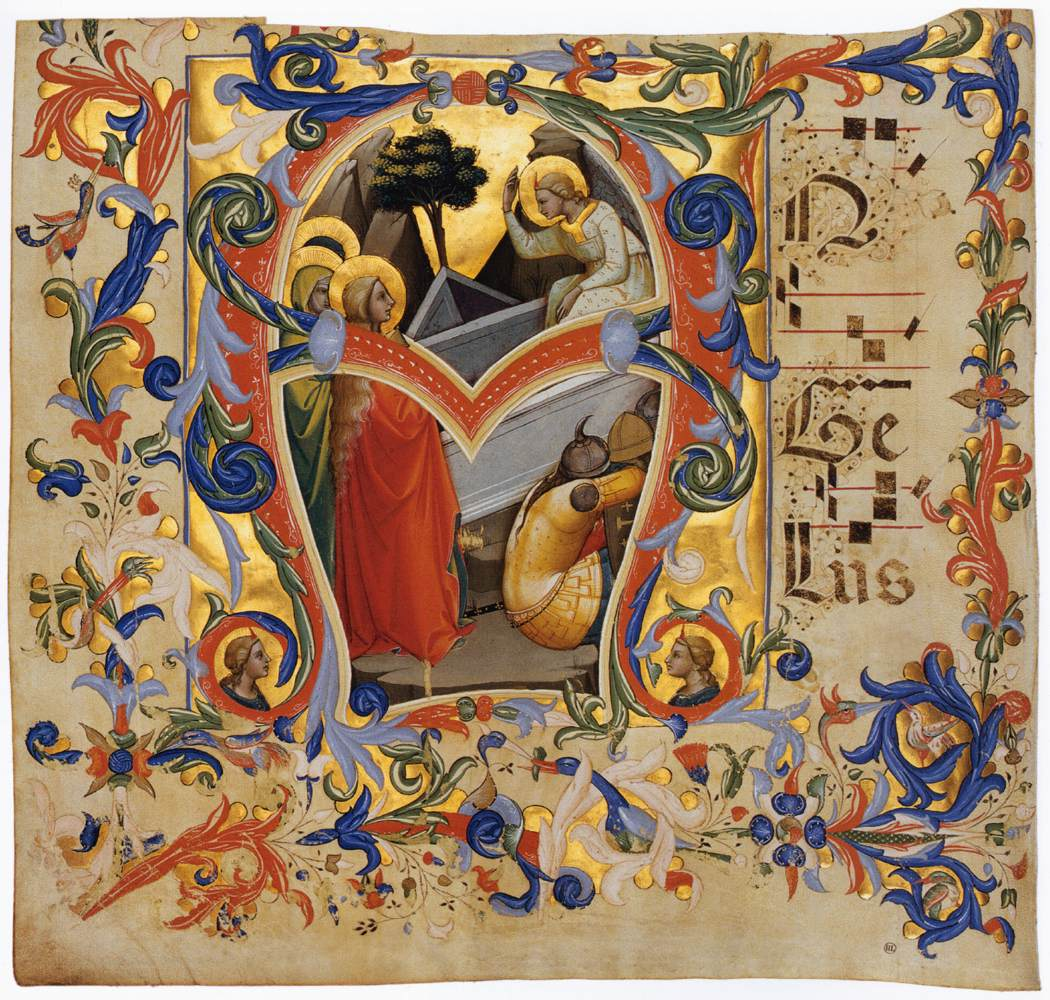
The Three Marys at the Tomb Manuscript illumination by Lorenzo Monaco, 1396

Les Trois Maries ("The Three Marys") or L'Histoire des trois Maries ("Story of the three Marys") is a long poem in French written circa 1357 by a Jean de Venette who may not be the same as the chronicler. The three Marys spoken of are: Mary, Mother of Our Lord, Mary Cleophas and Mary Salome of St. Palaye, that is to say the "three daughters of Saint Anne".

The poem has not received a modern edition. Manuscripts include five at the BnF in Paris, and one in the British Library. One manuscript copy (BnF MS, Fr. 24311) on vellum from the mid-fifteenth century contains 232 pages, with titles in red, and some initials in gold and color. It is decorated with seven miniatures in grisaille, and begins:

Cy commence le liure intitule le liure des troiz maries lequel compila fit & ordonna frère Jehan Filions de Venette lez compiegne en beauuoisins de lordre des Carmes lan 1357 acompli ou moys de may ledit an a lheure des compiles

Here begins the book called the book of the three Marys which was created, made and done by Brother Jean Fillon of Venette near Compiègne, a member of the Carmelite Order, in the year 1357, finished in the month of May that year at the hour of Compline.

A prose version was completed by Jean Drouyn in 1505, and printed in several editions.

== External links and further reading ==
- P.M. Rogers, Aspects of Western Civilization,(Prentice Hall, 2000), 353–365
- "Peasants at War in France: Guillaume l'Aloue in 1359," De Re Militari: The Society for Medieval Military History, ed. Peter Konieczny, 23 Feb 2008
- Works by or about Jean de Venette at the Internet Archive
