= Guillaume Pisdoé =

Mayor of Paris in 1297 and 1304

Guillaume Pisdoé, also known as Guillaume de Piedoue or Pizdoue, was the third Mayor of Paris in 1297 and again in 1304 under Philip IV of France. His son Guillaume II Pisdoé served as the First Equerry of the King (Master of Stables) in 1316, charged with carrying the Royal Sword of Philip V.

== Pisdoé Family (alias Piédoüe d'Héritôt) ==
The Pisdoé family was one of the richest and most powerful Parisian dynasties during the Middle Ages. Four members of the family served as Mayor of Paris, and numerous others as municipal magistrates. The Pisdoé used to be one of the main bankers of the Capetian dynasty during the 13th and 14th centuries. They were involved in financing the Seventh Crusade, as well as the construction of the second part of the Notre-Dame de Paris cathedral between 1250 and 1345 and the second part of the Saint-Germain l'Auxerrois church.

Fifty years later, in 1358, the Pisdoé financed Etienne Marcel's revolt. Martin Pisdoe, son of Jean Pisdoe and brother of Guillaume II, also Mayor of Paris and Master of Laical Accounts (head of the Court of Finances) for King John II of France, conspired after Marcel's death with his friend Charles the Bad, King of Navarre, against the Dauphin (the future Charles V) to depose the future king. Martin came to the Louvre to murder the king, but was betrayed before arriving and was decapitated. The Pisdoé were declared guilty of lèse majesté against Charles V in 1359 and had to leave Paris for four centuries. The main part of their fortune (Castle of Marcoussis, Castle of Beauvoir, numerous mansions, lands and buildings in Paris, the familial private mansion "La Cour Pavée" extending from Saint-Jacques de la Boucherie church to Place du Chatelet...) and the Pisdoé Bank were impounded by Charles V. The whole family quickly left and settled in Normandy on its land of Héritôt-Ernetôt. Four centuries later, Louis XV decided to forgive of the Piédoüe's offenses in memory of their loyalty to the Capetians and elevated Héritôt from a lordship to a marquisate. Each first-born child of the main branch has the title of Marquess of Héritôt-Ernetôt, in addition to their old titles of Viscount of Evrecy, Lord of Nerval, of Harcourt.
