= Jacquerie =

French peasant uprising in 1358

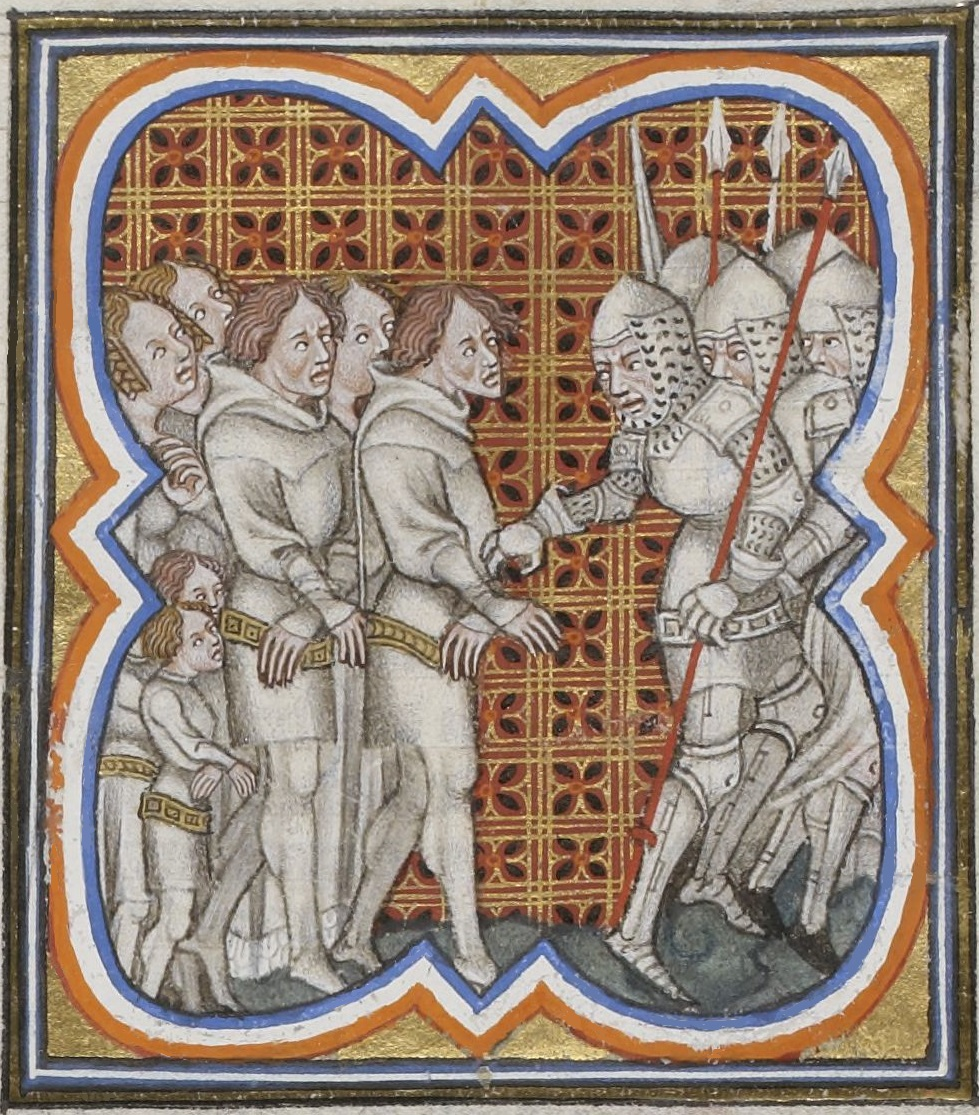
Prisoners in an illuminated manuscript by Jean Froissart.

The Jacquerie (French: [ʒakʁi]) was a popular revolt by peasants that took place in northern France in the early summer of 1358 during the Hundred Years' War. The revolt was centred in the valley of the Oise north of Paris and was suppressed after over two months of violence. This rebellion became known as "the Jacquerie" because the nobles derided peasants as "Jacques" or "Jacques Bonhomme" for their padded surplice, called a "jacque". The aristocratic chronicler Jean Froissart and his source, the chronicle of Jean le Bel, referred to the leader of the revolt as Jacque Bonhomme ("Jack Goodfellow"), though in fact the Jacquerie's "great captain" was named Guillaume Cale. The word jacquerie became a synonym of peasant uprisings in general in both English and French.

== Background ==
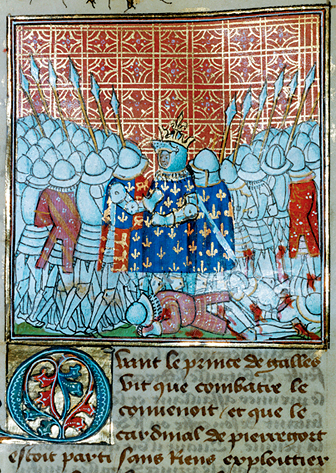
King John II, along his fourteen-year-old son, Philip, was captured by the English at the Battle of Poitiers.

After the capture of the French king (John II, Froissart's bon roi Jean "good king John") by the English during the Battle of Poitiers in September 1356, power in France devolved fruitlessly among the Estates-General and John's son, the Dauphin, later Charles V.

The Estates-General were too divided to provide effective government and their alliance with King Charles II of Navarre, another claimant to the French throne, provoked disunity amongst the nobles. Consequently, the prestige of the French nobility sank to a new low. The century had begun poorly for the nobles at Courtrai (the "Battle of the Golden Spurs"), where they fled the field and left their infantry to be hacked to pieces; they were also accused of having given up their king at the Battle of Poitiers. The passage of a law that required the peasants to defend the châteaux that were emblems of their oppression was the immediate cause of the spontaneous uprising. The law was particularly resented as many commoners already blamed the nobility for the defeat at Poitiers. The chronicle of Jean de Venette articulates the perceived problems between the nobility and the peasants, yet some historians, such as Samuel K. Cohn, see the Jacquerie revolts as a reaction to a combination of short- and long-term effects dating from as early as the grain crisis and famine of 1315.

In addition, as a result of the temporary lull in hostilities of the Hundred Years' War due to the French defeat at Poitiers, thousands of soldiers and mercenaries on both sides of the conflict found themselves "without commanders or wages". Many of them responded by forming free companies, attacking both military and civilian targets such as castles and villages (often to ransom for a profit) and engaging in frequent acts of rape, looting and murder. Their ability to do so was exacerbated by the lack of an efficient government authority in many parts of France, which left the French peasantry disillusioned with France's nobility that was perceived as failing to meet its feudal obligations.

== Uprising ==
This combination of problems set the stage for a brief series of bloody rebellions in northern France in 1358. The uprisings began in a village of St. Leu near the Oise river, where a group of peasants met to discuss their perception that the nobles had abandoned the King at Poitiers. "They shamed and despoiled the realm, and it would be a good thing to destroy them all."

The account of the rising by the contemporary chronicler Jean le Bel includes a description of horrifying violence:

I dare not write the horrible deeds that they did to ladies and damsels; among others, they slew a knight and [then] put him on a spit and roasted him at the fire in sight of the lady, his wife and children, and after that the lady was forced and raped by ten or twelve of them, and then they made her eat of her husband, and after made her die an evil death with all her children.

Examples of violence on this scale by the French peasants are offered throughout the medieval sources, including accounts by Jean de Venette and Jean Froissart, an aristocrat who was particularly unsympathetic to the peasants. Among the chroniclers, the one sympathetic to their plight is Jean de Venette, sometimes (but erroneously) known as the continuator of the chronicle of Guillaume de Nangis.

Jean le Bel speculated that governors and tax collectors spread the word of rebellion from village to village to inspire the peasants to rebel against the nobility. When asked as to the cause of their discontent they apparently replied that they were just doing what they had witnessed others doing. Additionally it seems that the rebellion contained some idea that it was possible to rid the world of nobles. Froissart's account portrays the rebels as mindless savages bent on destruction, which they wrought on over 150 noble houses and castles, murdering the families in horrific ways. The bourgeoisie of Beauvais, Senlis, Paris, Amiens, and Meaux, sorely pressed by the court party, accepted the Jacquerie, and the urban underclass were sympathetic. Village notables often provided leadership for some of the peasant bands, although in letters of pardon issued after the suppression of the rising, such individuals claimed that they were forced to do so.

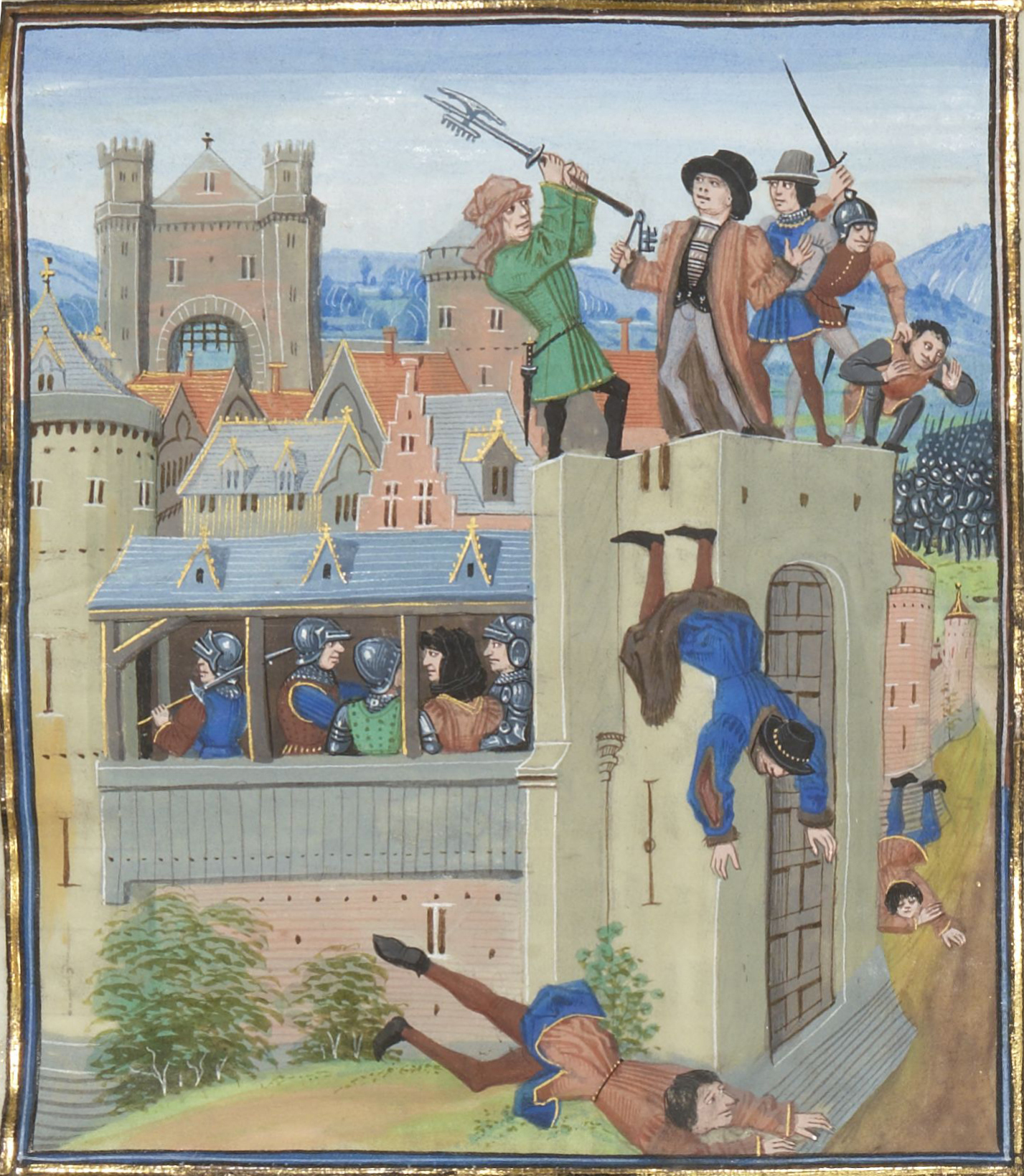
The assassination of Étienne Marcel

The Jacquerie must be seen in the context of this period of internal instability. At a time of personal government, the absence of a charismatic king was detrimental to the still-feudal state. The Dauphin had to contend with roaming free companies of out-of-work mercenaries, the plotting of Charles the Bad, and the possibility of another English invasion. The Dauphin gained effective control of the realm only after the supposed surrender of the city of Paris after the murder of the leader of the Estates General Étienne Marcel, prevôt des marchands on 31 July 1358. It is notable that churches were not generally the targets of peasant fury, with the possible exception of some clerics in Champagne.

== Suppression ==
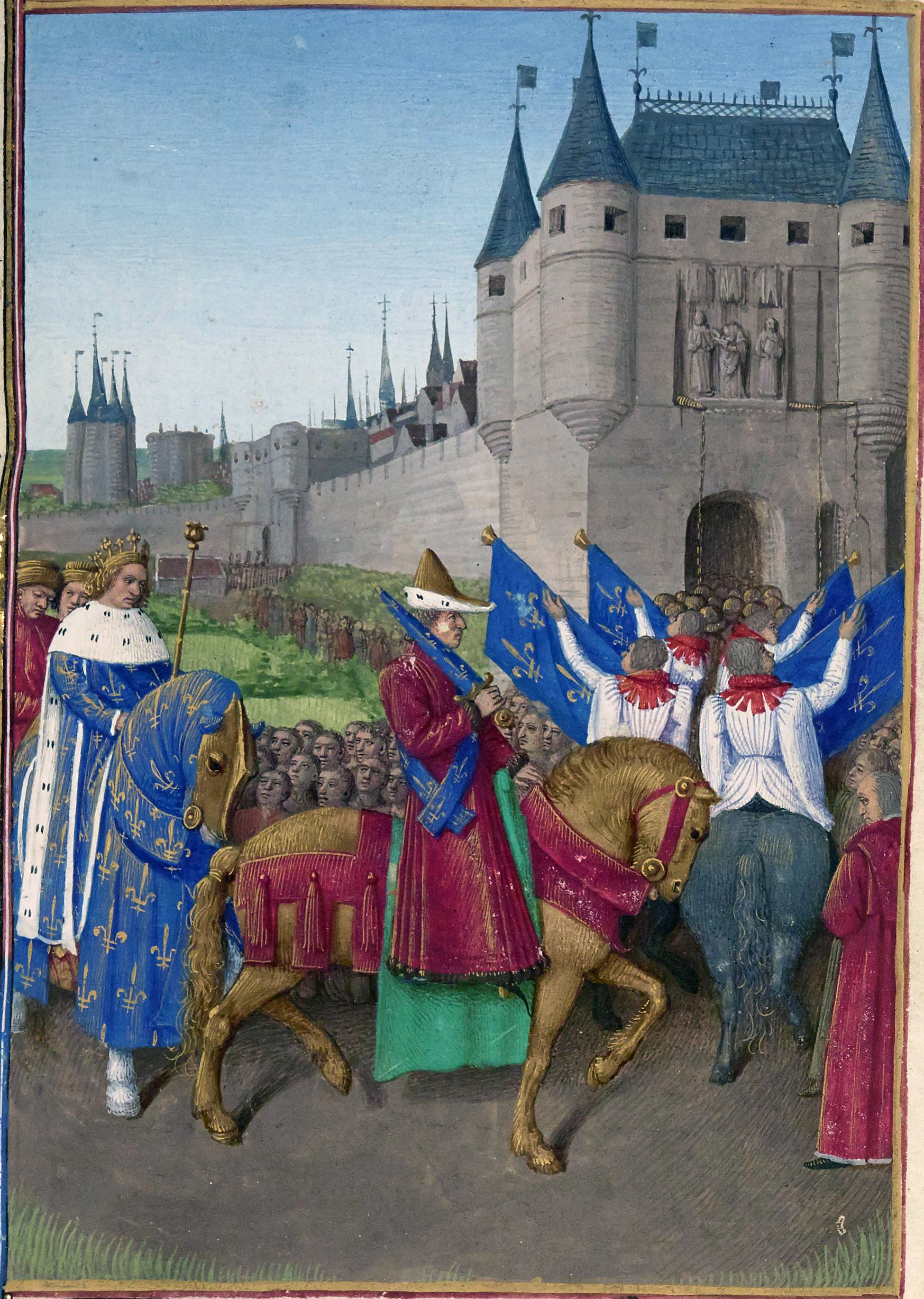
The re-entry of Dauphin Charles into Paris after the assassination of Étienne Marcel in an illustration of ca. 1455–1460 by Jean Fouquet in the Grandes Chroniques de France

The revolt was suppressed by French nobles and gentry led by the Dauphin and Charles II of Navarre, cousin, brother-in-law, and mortal enemy of the Regent, whose throne he was attempting to usurp. His army and the peasant force opposed each other near Mello on 10 June 1358, when Guillaume Cale, the leader of the rebellion, was invited to truce talks by Charles. He went to the enemy camp, where he was seized by the French nobles, who considered that the conventions and standards of chivalry did not apply to him; he was tortured and decapitated.

The now leaderless army, which Froisart claimed to be 100,000 strong in his narrative heavily influenced by chivalric romance, was ridden down by divisions of mounted knights. In the ensuing Battle of Mello and in a campaign of terror throughout Beauvais, knights, squires, men-at-arms and mercenaries roamed the countryside lynching peasants.

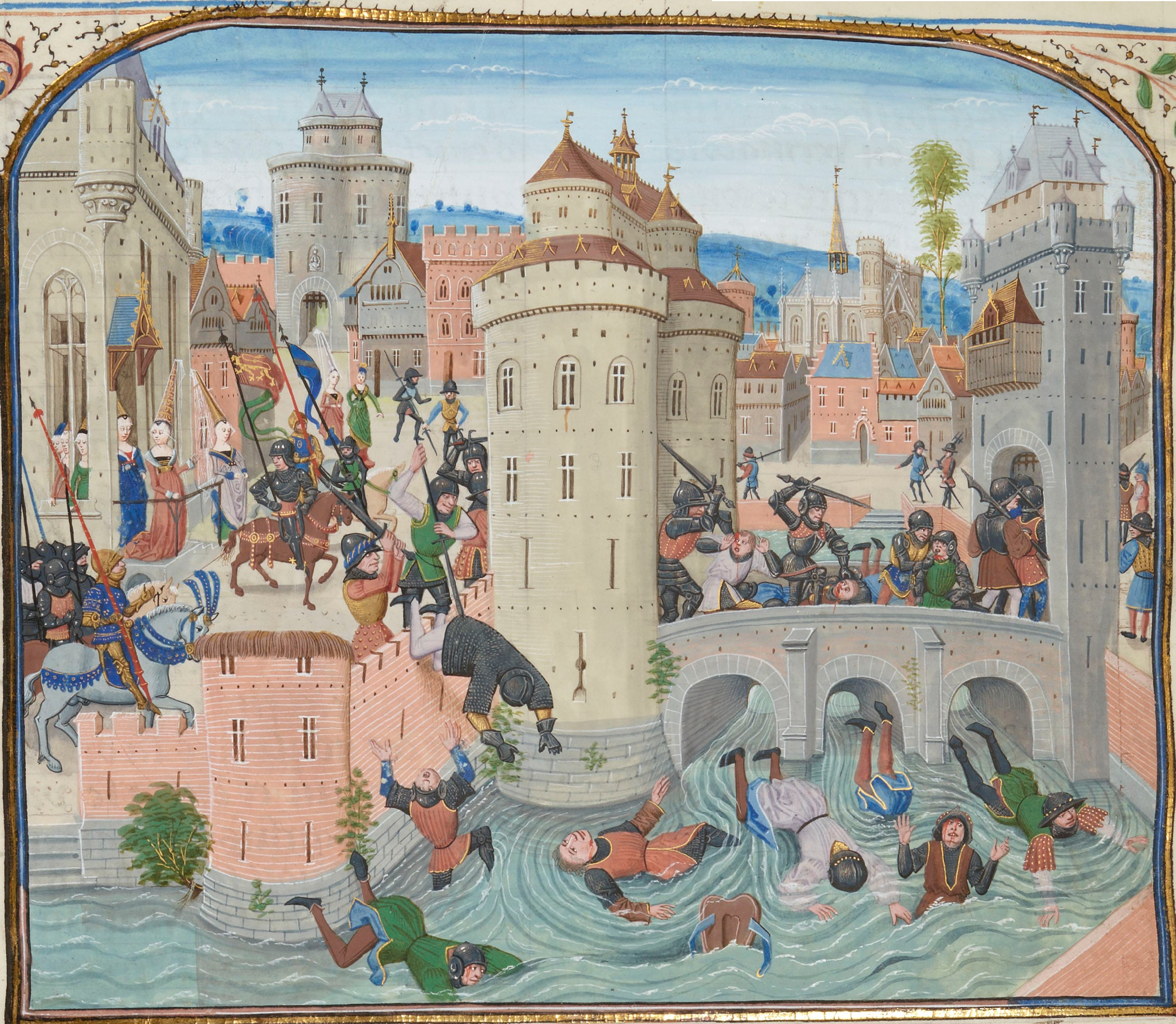
Defeat of the Jacquerie in Meaux on 9 June 1358

Another major battle transpired at Meaux, where the fortified citadel was crowded with knights and their dependents. On 9 June, a band of armed commoners came out of Paris under the leadership of Etienne Marcel to support the rising. One contemporary source, Jacques of Froissart, wrote that the band was 10,000 in number. When the band from Paris appeared before Meaux, they were taken in hospitably by the disaffected townspeople and fed. The fortress, somewhat apart from the town, remained unassailable.

Two captain adventurers, returning from the Prussian Crusade, were at Châlons: Gaston III, Count of Foix and his noble Gascon cousin, Jean III de Grailly. The approach of their well-armed lancers encouraged the besieged nobles in the fortress, and a general rout of the Parisian force ensued. The nobles then set fire to the suburb nearest the fortress, entrapping the burghers in the flames. The mayor of Meaux and other prominent men of the city were hanged. There was a pause, and then the force led by the nobles and gentry plundered the city and churches and set fire to Meaux, which burned for two weeks. They then overran the countryside, burning cottages and barns and slaughtering all the peasants they could find.

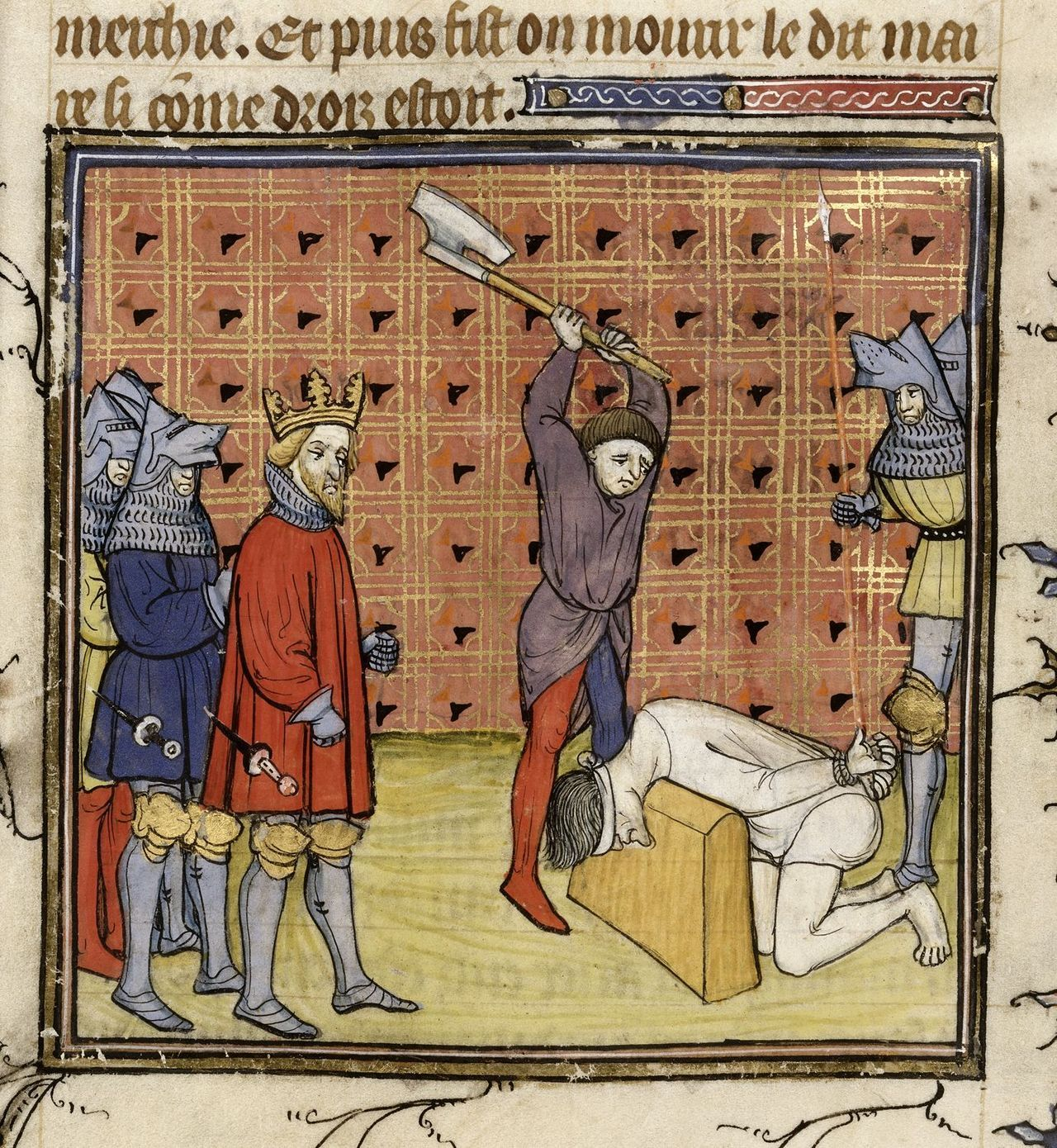
King Charles II of Navarre had the leaders of the Jacquerie executed. Illustration from the Chroniques de France ou de St Denis dating from after 1380.

The reprisals continued through July and August. Senlis defended itself. Knights of County of Hainaut, County of Flanders, and Duchy of Brabant joined in the carnage. Following the declaration of amnesty issued by the Regent on 10 August 1358, such heavy fines were assessed upon the regions that had supported the Jacquerie that a general flight ensued. Historian Barbara Tuchman says: "Like every insurrection of the century, it was smashed, as soon as the rulers recovered their nerve, by weight of steel, and the advantages of the man on horseback, and the psychological inferiority of the insurgents".

The slanted but vivid account of Froissart can be balanced by the Regent's letter of general amnesty, a document that comments as severely on the nobles' reaction as on the peasants' rising and omits the atrocities detailed by Froissart: "it represents the men of the open country assembling spontaneously in various localities, in order to deliberate on the means of resisting the English, and suddenly, as with a mutual agreement, turning fiercely on the nobles".

The Jacquerie traumatized the aristocracy. In 1872, Louis Raymond de Vericour remarked to the Royal Historical Society:

To this very day the word "Jacquerie" does not generally give rise to any other idea than that of a bloodthirsty, iniquitous, groundless revolt of a mass of savages. Whenever, on the Continent, any agitation takes place, however slight and legitimate it may be, among the humbler classes, innumerable voices, in higher, privileged, wealthy classes, proclaim that society is threatened with a Jacquerie.

== In the arts ==
- The contemporary literary chronicles were influenced by other medieval genres: romance, satire, and complaint.
- The subject of the Jacquerie engaged the Romantic historical imagination, resulting in numerous nineteenth-century historical novels with somewhat operatic plots set against the backdrop of the Jacquerie—The Jacquerie, or, The Lady and the Page: An Historical Romance by G. P. R James (1842) and the like— and even an opera, La jacquerie, by Édouard Lalo.
- In Charles Dickens' A Tale of Two Cities, the revolutionaries call themselves "Jacques".
- Eugène Sue's novel The Iron Trevet (part of Sue's "Mysteries of the People" sequence) gives a sympathetic account of the Jacquerie rebels.
- In Thomas Love Peacock's Crotchet Castle, Dr Folliott compares a local riot with the Jacquerie and expresses nostalgia for "that blessed middle period, after the Jacquerie was down and before the March of Mind was up".
- Arthur Conan Doyle's historical novel "The White Company" includes a chapter where the English free company of the title rescue French nobility from peasants of the Jacquerie - portrayed as savage and brutish.
- The 1961 novel A Walk with Love and Death by Hans Koningsberger takes place in northern France during the Jacquerie. The revolt provided the basis for a film of the same name directed by John Huston in 1969.
- A somewhat fictionalized version of the Jacquerie is featured in the 1962 Blake and Mortimer comic album The Time Trap.
- German progressive rock band Eloy's 1975 concept album Power and the Passion partially takes place in France in 1358 with the Jacquerie being an important part of the story.
- Catherine Ribeiro's album Jacqueries was named after the uprising and was based on poems by Jacques Prévert.
- The satirical short story "The Stampeding of Lady Bastable", c. 1911 by Saki, contains the following passage:

Lady Bastable was roused from the world of newspaper lore by hearing a Japanese screen in the hall go down with a crash. Then the door leading from the hall flew open and her young guest tore madly through the room, shrieked at her in passing, "The jacquerie! They're on us!" and dashed like an escaping hawk out through the French window. The scared mob of servants burst in on his heels, the gardener still clutching the sickle with which he had been trimming hedges, and the impetus of their headlong haste carried them, slipping and sliding, over the smooth parquet flooring towards the chair where their mistress sat in panic-stricken amazement.

== Sources ==
- J. B. Bury, The Cambridge Medieval History: Decline of Empire and Papacy, Vol. VII. New York: Macmillan Company, 1932.
- Samuel K. Cohn, Jr., Popular Protest in Late Medieval Europe. Manchester: Manchester University Press.
- Justine Firnhaber-Baker, The Jacquerie of 1358: A French Peasants' Revolt. Oxford: Oxford University Press, 2021.
- Jean Froissart. Chronicles. London: Penguin Books, 1978.
