= Criminal Ordinance of 1670 =

French criminal ordinance

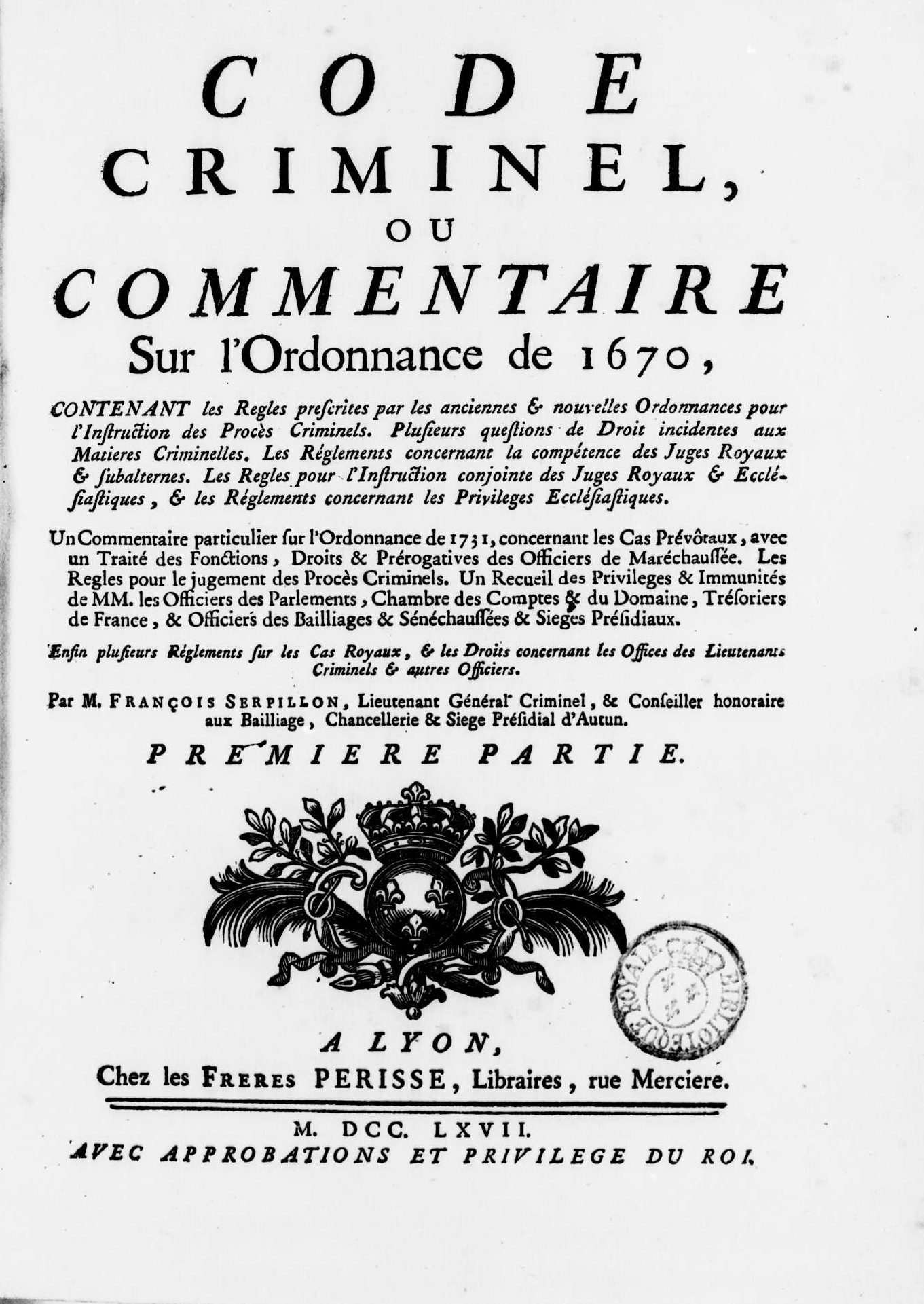
François Serpillon, Code criminel, ou commentaire sur l'ordonnace de 1670, 1767

The Criminal Ordinance of 1670 (French: Ordonnance criminelle de 1670, or Ordonnance criminelle de Colbert) was a Great Ordinance dealing with criminal procedure which was enacted in France under the reign of King Louis XIV. Made in Saint-Germain-en-Laye, the Ordinance was registered by the Parlement of Paris on 26 August 1670 and came into effect on 1 January 1671. It was one of the first legal texts attempting to codify criminal law in France. It remained in force until the French Revolution, when it was abrogated by a decree adopted by the National Constituent Assembly on 9 October 1789.

The act broadened the jurisdiction of the nationwide policing force Maréchaussée to include burglary and popular disorder and confirmed its power to arrest any offender. It also sought to combat abuse of their authority by putting enforcement under the supervision of local royal courts.

== History ==
The Ancien regime ruled without a penal code. On the other hand, they had a code of criminal procedure in the form of the ordonnance criminelle de 1670.

== Objectives ==
Major goals of the ordinance, were: to let no crime go unpunished; to prevent an innocent person for being convicted of a crime he did not commit; and to enable the judge to apply the criminal law with exactitude, which is to say, to establish a precise proportionality between the offense and the punishment for the offense.

== See also ==
- French criminal law

== Works cited ==
- Roux, Jean-André (1925). "Procédure pénale". Précis élémentaire de droit pénal et de procédure pénale [A primer on criminal law and procedure] (in French). Paris: Recueil Sirey. p. 177. OCLC 18140063.
