= Great Ordinance =

The phrase "Great Ordinance" was also an early term for artillery, more usually spelt "Great Ordnance".

In French political history, a great ordinance or grand ordinance (French – Grande ordonnance) was an important royal ordinance or decree. The French Estates-General might also adopt one to, for example, grant the king the exclusive right to raise troops, and establish the taxation measure known as the taille in support of a standing army.

Examples included:

- the Grande ordonnance pour la réforme du royaume (the Great Ordinance for the reform of the kingdom): Louis IX forbade blasphemy, gaming, prostitution, tourneys, and trial by ordeal, made the circulation of the royal coin compulsory, and delegated the administration of royal justice to jurists (the origin of the French parliament).
- the Great Ordinance of 1357, intended to curb royal power, but in the end never applied
- the Grande ordonnance which put in place the compagnies d'ordonnance, the first permanent units of the French army;
- the Grande ordonnance des Eaux et Forêts (Grand Ordinance of the Waters and Forests) of 1516, by which Francis I regulated the management of his domain and of the hunt – this ordinance was revived in 1669.

Colbert also took several other ordinances to be Great Ordinances :

- the Grande ordonnance de procédure civile (Grand Ordinance on civil procedure) signed at Saint-Germain-en-Laye, called the Code Louis, making it compulsory to record baptisms, marriages and burials in the registers of the civil state (as opposed to the registers of the church);
- the Grande ordonnance criminelle (Grand Ordinance on criminal law) in 1670;
- the Grande ordonnance de la marine (Grand Ordinance on the fleet) in 1681 :
- the Grande ordonnance sur les colonies (Grand Ordinance on the colonies), also known as the Code noir (1685).
