= Bohemian Crusade (1340) =

Military expedition

Crusade against Waldensians in Bohemia
- Part of the Crusades
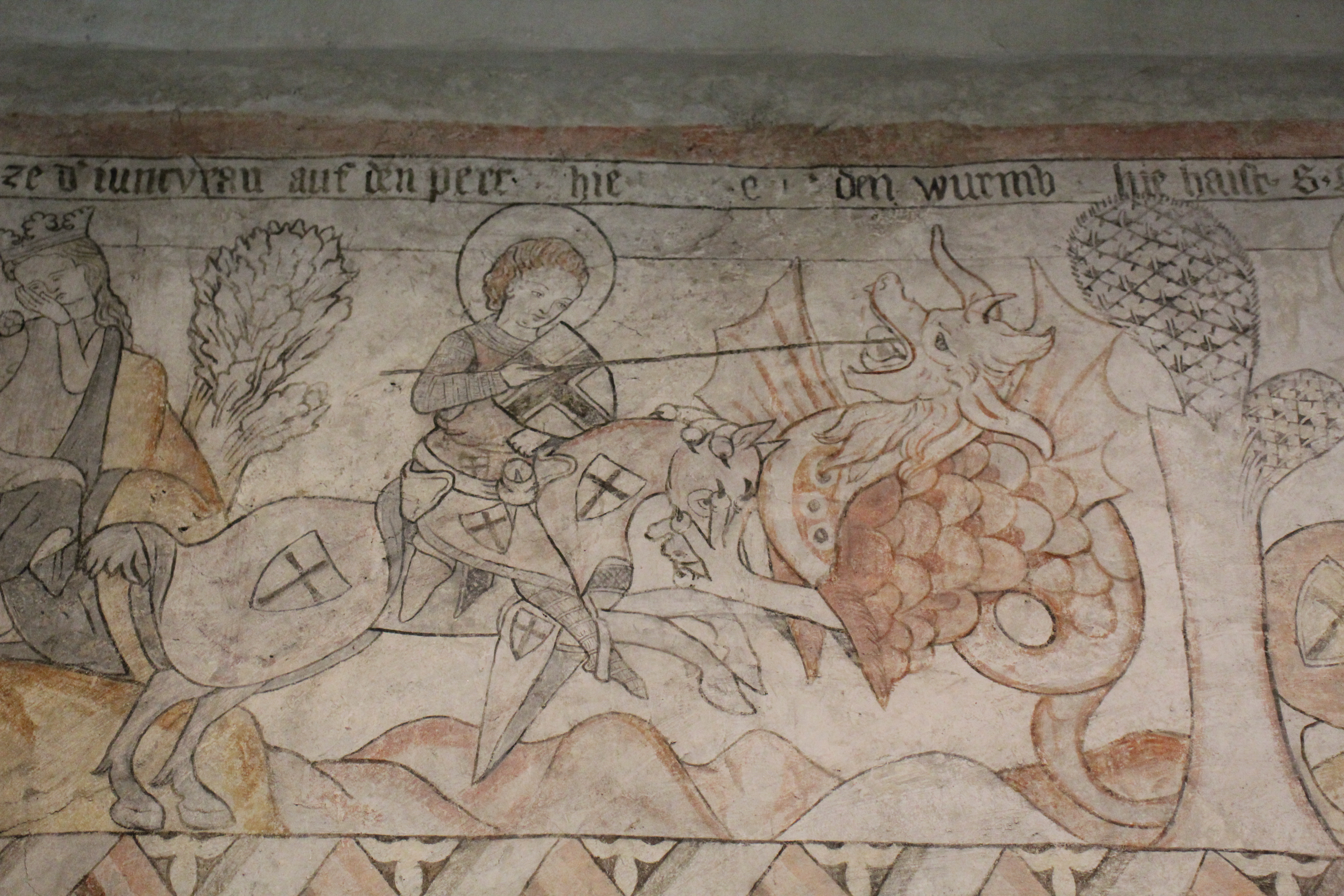
- St. George fighting a dragon, Jindřichův Hradec, made according to Oldřich III
| Date | 1340 |
| Location | Jindřichův Hradec, Kingdom of Bohemia |

Belligerents
| Lordship of Jindřichův Hradec | Waldensians of the Lordship of Jindřichův Hradec |

Commanders and leaders
| Oldřich III of Hradec | Unknown |

The Bohemian Crusade of 1340 was a military expedition against heretics in Bohemia.

Around 1340, most heretics in Bohemia were Germans, either Waldensians or Beguines and Beghards. They were accused of theft and violence against orthodox Christians. In 1335, Pope Benedict XII appointed Gallus de Novo Castro as inquisitor for the region around Prague with the goal of converting heretics. Although he made some success, he met substantial resistance. In 1339, he travelled to Avignon to confer with Benedict on future action, bringing with him Ulrich (Oldřich) III, lord of Hradec.

While Gallus and Ulrich were in Avignon, some converted heretics relapsed, plundered church property and burnt Ulrich's castle along with several villages under his jurisdiction. The lord of Hradec promptly asked the pope to authorize him to lead a crusade against the heretics. In a bull dated 6 March 1340, Benedict XII formally granted the same indulgence to those who took part in Ulrich's punitive expedition as they would obtain pilgrimage to the Holy Land. The expedition took place, but no details of operations are known. Gallus's inquisition was also prosecuted with increased tenacity, so that Benedict wrote to Ulrich on 13 September 1341 requesting him to make available his jails for those arrested by Gallus.

The anti-heretic crusade was not the only one preached in Bohemia in 1340. In light of the Tatar invasion of Poland, it was also rumoured that the Tatars intended to attack Bohemia. Benedict XII, responding to a request from King Casimir III of Poland, ordered the crusade preached in Bohemia. According to Galvano Fiamma, King John the Blind of Bohemia joined the defence of Poland.
