= Robert le Coq =

French bishop and councillor

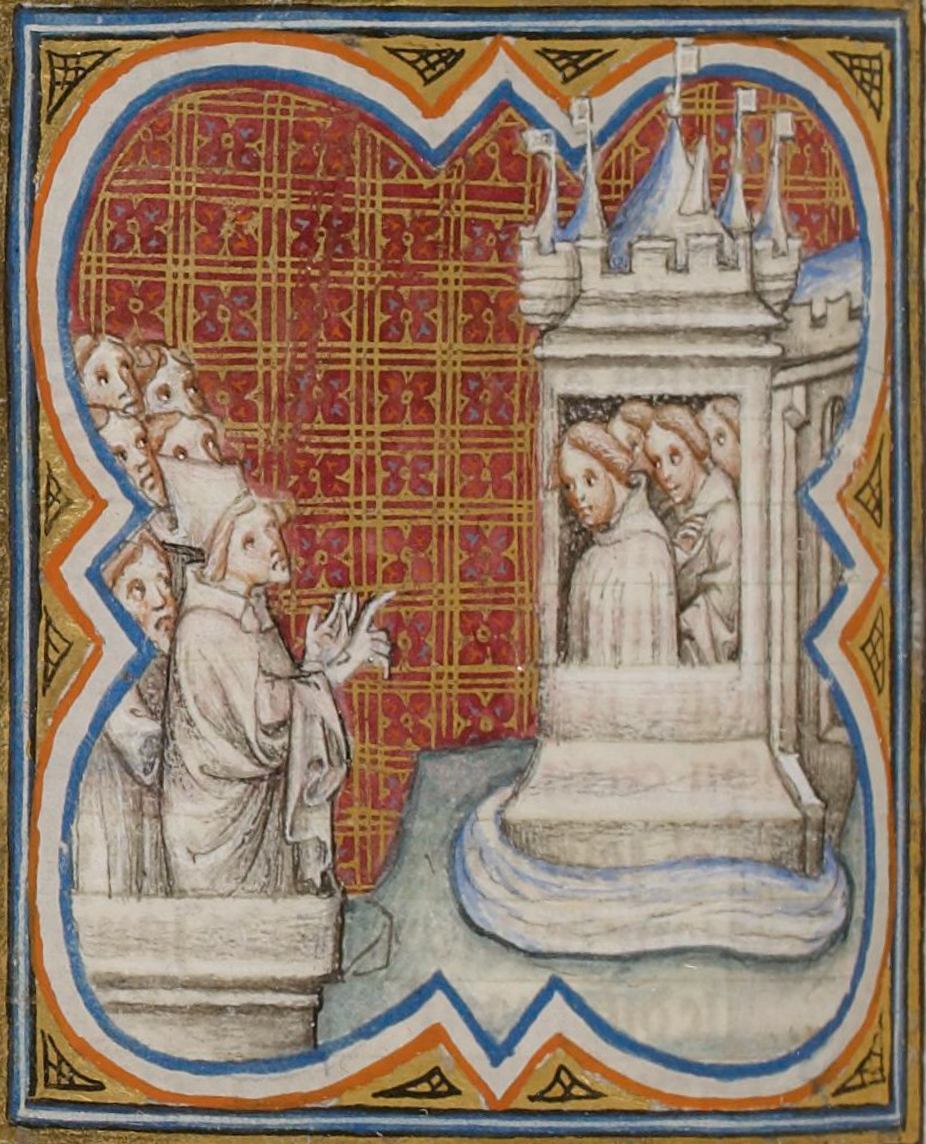
Robert Le Coq, bishop of Laon, accusing the king's officers. From the 14th century Grandes Chroniques de France.

Robert le Coq (died 1373) was a French bishop and councillor.

Le Coq was born in Montdidier. He belonged to a bourgeois family of Orléans, where he first attended school before coming to Paris. In Paris he became advocate to the parlement (1347); then John II appointed him master of requests, and in 1351, a year during which he received many other honors, he became bishop of Laon. At the opening of 1354 he was sent with the cardinal of Boulogne, Peter I, Duke of Bourbon, and Jean VI, count of Vendôme, to Mantes to treat with Charles the Bad, king of Navarre, who had caused the constable, Charles d'Espagne, to be assassinated, and from this time dates his connection with this king.

At the meeting of the estates which opened in Paris in October 1356 le Coq played a leading role and was one of the most outspoken of the orators, especially when petitions were presented to the dauphin Charles, denouncing the bad government of the realm and demanding the banishment of the royal councillors. Soon, however, the credit of the estates having gone down, he withdrew to his diocese, but at the request of the bourgeois of Paris he speedily returned. The king of Navarre had succeeded in escaping from prison and had entered Paris, where his party was in the ascendant; and Robert le Coq became the most powerful person in his council. No one dared to contradict him, and he brought into it whom he pleased. He did not scruple to reveal to the king of Navarre secret deliberations, but his fortune soon turned. He ran great danger at the estates of Compiègne in May 1358, where his dismissal was demanded, and he had to flee to Saint-Denis, where Charles the Bad and Étienne Marcel came to find him. After the death of Marcel, he tried, unsuccessfully, to deliver Laon, his episcopal town, to the king of Navarre, and he was excluded from the amnesty promised in the treaty of Calais (1360) by King John to the partisans of Charles the Bad. His temporalities had been seized, and he was obliged to flee from France. In 1363, thanks to the support of the king of Navarre, he was given the bishopric of Calahorra in the kingdom of Aragon, which he administered until his death in 1373.

== Sources ==
- L. C. Douet d'Arcq (1841), "Acte d'accusation contre Robert le Coq, évêque de Laon", in Bibliothèque de l'école des Charles, 1st series, 2(1) pp. 350–387. doi:10.3406/bec.1841.451590
- R. Delachenal, "La Bibliotheque d'un avocat du XIV siecle, inventaire estimatif des livres de Robert le Coq", in Nouvelle revue historique de droit franâais et étranger, 1887.
