= Augustine of Trent =

Augustinian friar and astrologer

Start of the Epistola in Clm 647

Augustine of Trent (c. 1300 – after 1340) was an Augustinian friar and astrologer.

Augustine was born in Trent in the late 13th or early 14th century. He entered the Augustinian order and studied astrology and medicine. In 1340, he was the chaplain of Bishop Nicholas of Trent (1336–1347) and a lecturer at the University of Perugia. On 12 July that year, he dedicated his Epistola astrologica to the bishop. No other work by him is known; neither is his date of death.

Augustine wrote his Epistola in Latin in Perugia on the occasion of a "pestilence of infirmities" in northern Italy. He disagrees with those who attribute it to heavy rains, since heavy rains fell in 1338 and there was no pestilence. He gives an astrological explanation of the epidemic and seeks to provide principles for predicting future ones. He cites Hippocrates, Aristotle, Galen, Dioscorides, Martial and Avicenna. Two manuscripts of Augustine's Epistola are known, Clm 276 and Clm 647 in the Bavarian State Library. The former was purchased in Germany by Hartmann Schedel and the second is the copy he made.
