= Mello, Oise =

Mello
- Commune
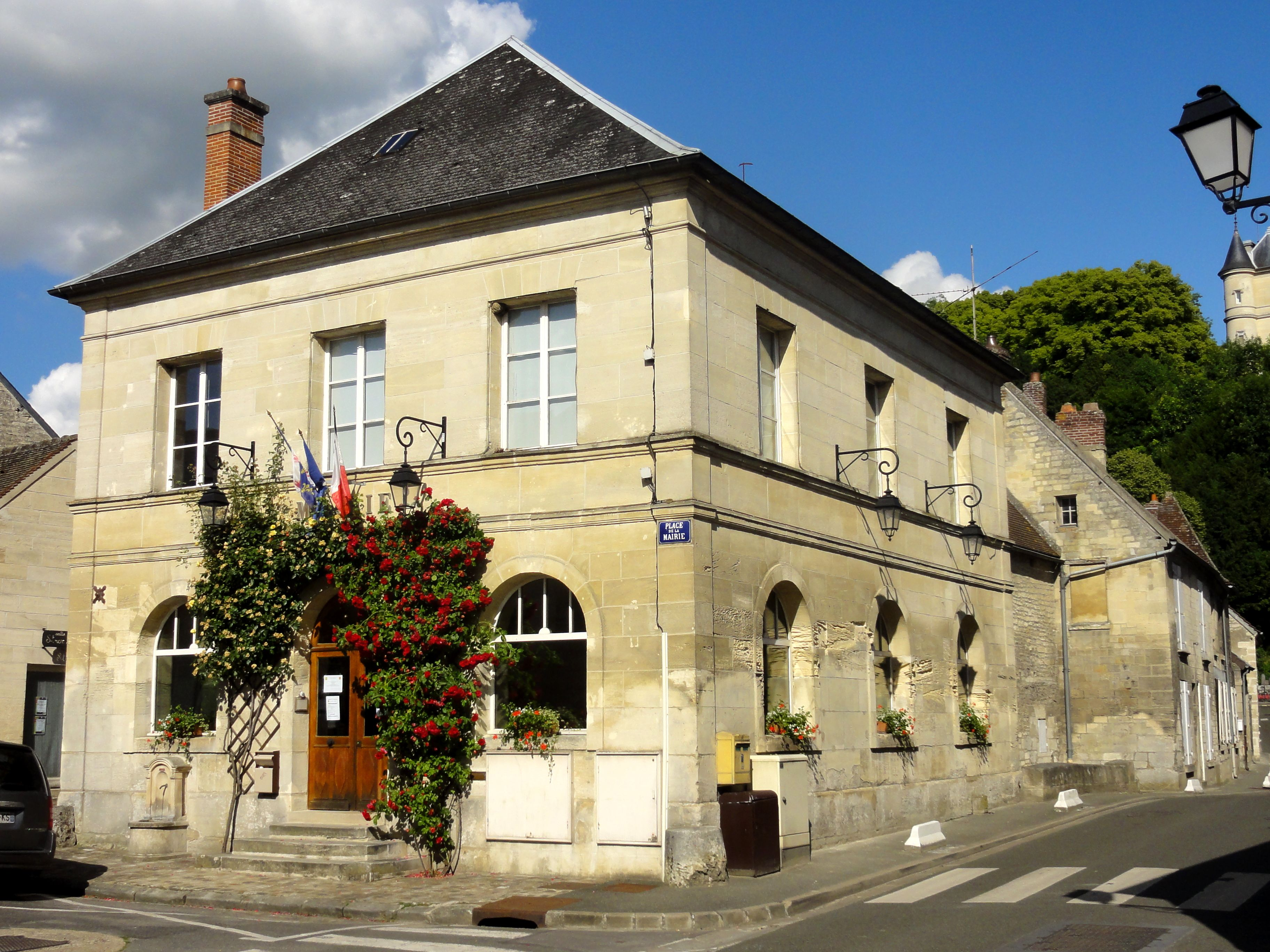
- The town hall in Mello

- Coat of arms
- Location of Mello
- Location within France Location within Hauts-de-France
- Coordinates: 49°16′23″N 2°21′59″E
- Country: France
- Region: Hauts-de-France
- Department: Oise
- Arrondissement: Senlis
- Canton: Montataire

Government
  - Mayor (2020–2026): Christelle Gauvin
- Area^{1}: 3.35 km^{2} (1.29 sq mi)
- Elevation: 37 m (121 ft)
- Highest elevation: 103 m (338 ft)
- Lowest elevation: 32 m (105 ft)
- Population (2023): 600
  - Density: 180/km^{2} (460/sq mi)
- Time zone: UTC+01:00 (CET)
  - Summer (DST): UTC+02:00 (CEST)
- INSEE/Postal code: 60393 /60660
- ^{1} French Land Register data, which excludes lakes, ponds, glaciers > 1 km^{2} (0.386 sq mi or 247 acres) and river estuaries.

Mello (French pronunciation: [mɛlo]) is a commune in the Oise department in northern France.

== See also ==
- Communes of the Oise department
