= Étienne Marcel =

French politician (d. 1358)

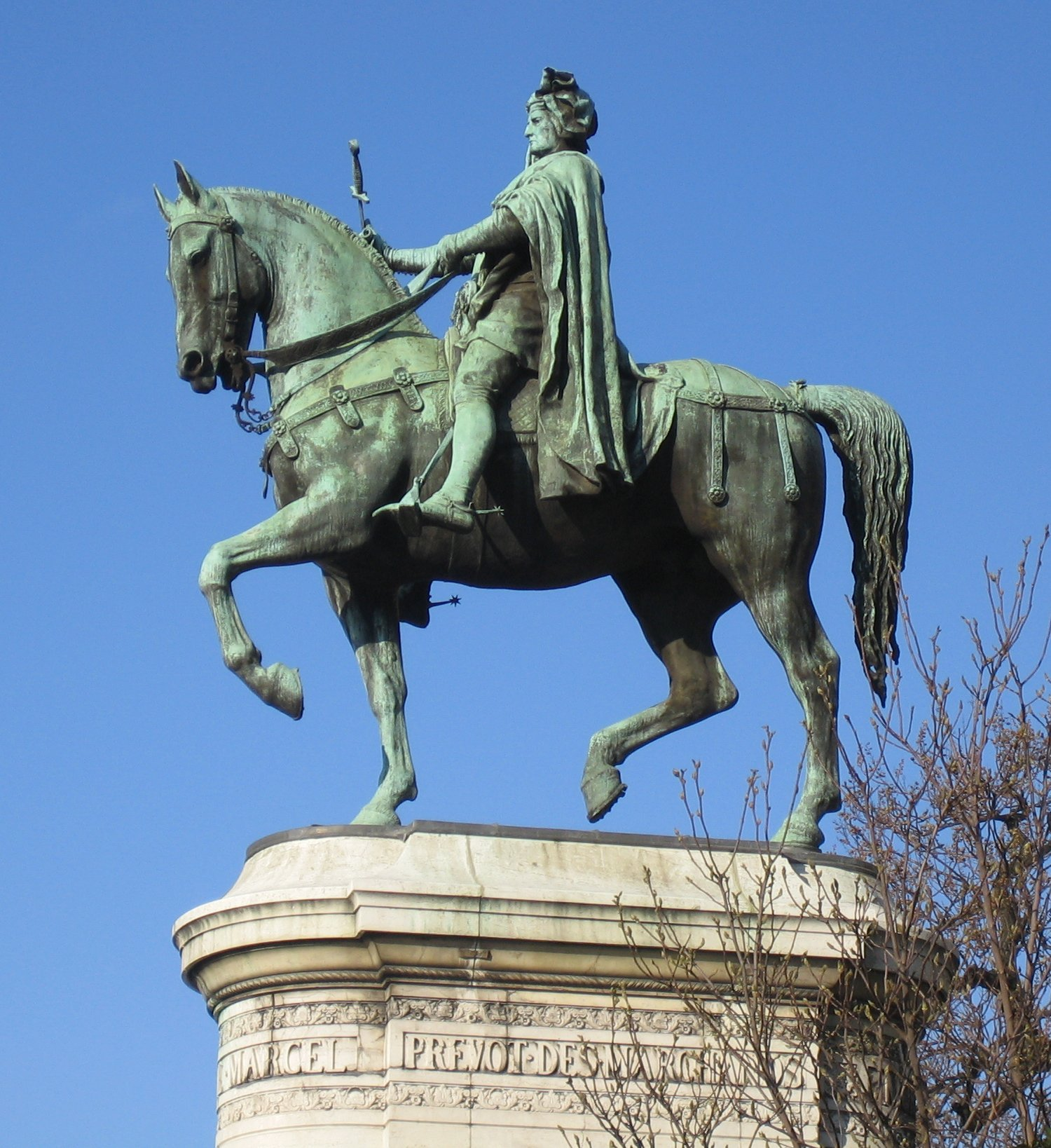
- Statue of Étienne Marcel by Antonin Idrac at the Hotel de Ville in Paris
- Born: between 1302 and 1310; Paris
- Died: 31 July 1358; Porte Saint Antoine, Paris
- Occupations: draper, Provost of Paris, political operative
- Known for: seeking to reform or overturn the French monarchy

Étienne Marcel (between 1302 and 1310 – 31 July 1358) was provost of the merchants of Paris under King John II of France, called John the Good (Jean le Bon). He distinguished himself in the defence of the small craftsmen and guildsmen who made up most of the city population.

As a delegate of the Third Estate, he played an important role in the general assemblies held during the Hundred Years' War. In 1357, he found himself at the head of a movement that tried to establish a reformed French monarchy, restraining the royal power and improving decision making. During the Jacquerie peasant rebellion, he supported King Charles II of Navarre over the Dauphin Charles. He was killed while trying to open the gates of the capital to the army of mercenaries who were allied with Charles, King of Navarre.

== Context: The crisis of feudal society ==
In 14th century France, the feudal system was in crisis because the nobility and clergy were no longer seen as fulfilling their assigned roles. They nevertheless imposed great costs that were borne mainly by the commoners. Increased taxation – linked to the costs and economic impacts of the Hundred Years’ War and of the Black Plague – impoverished many parts of French society and fed growing protests from the bourgeoisie. In order to avoid imposing increasingly unpopular taxes, the crown resorted to debasing the currency as a way of financing its expenditures. For this reason, tax revolt and financial reform were ideas that were already firmly rooted in many parts of French society.

Economic and cultural shifts led to the emergence of a powerful bourgeoisie that dominated trade and production and that had the financial wherewithal to purchase key offices within the royal government. A series of unsuccessful and expensive wars with the English brought discredit upon the French nobility. The nobility’s legitimacy was further undermined by its inability to protect commoners from the mercenaries who were marauding in the French countryside.

The growing protests and anti-royal sentiment were also encouraged by the relatively open political systems and economic success of the Flemish and Hanseatic cities, and by the weakening of royal power due to the crisis of legitimacy of the Valois dynasty.

== Birth, family origins and early career ==
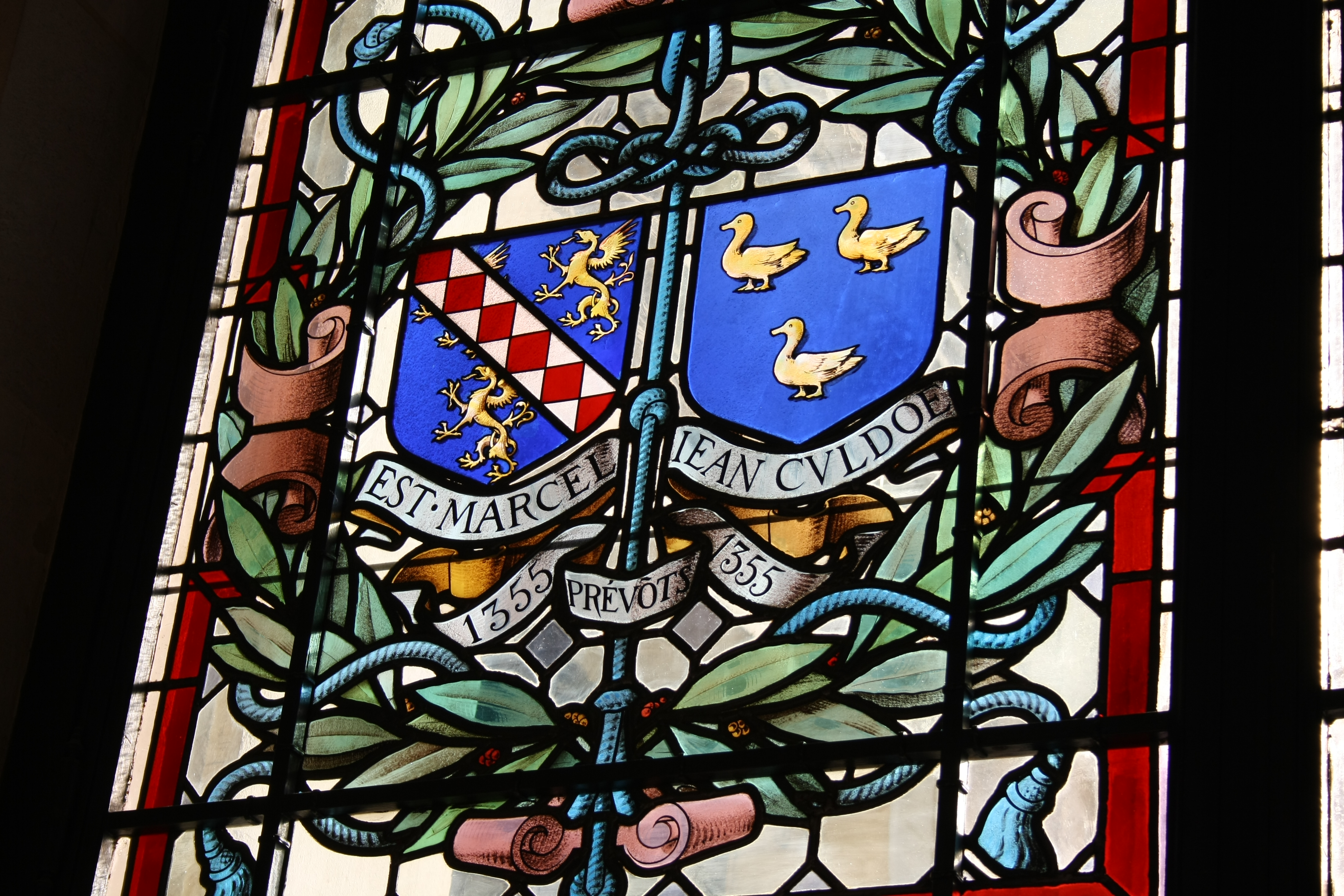
The coat of arms of Étienne Marcel in the Hotel de ville in Paris

Étienne Marcel was born somewhere between 1302 and 1310, son of Simon Marcel, a draper, and Isabelle Barbou. He was born into one of the most powerful families of the Parisian bourgeoisie. This large family of cloth merchants formed a close-knit network. The Marcel family imported fabrics from Flanders and Brabant, and they were suppliers to the court and the king, to whom they also lent money.

They also grew wealthy through real estate speculation and other ventures made possible by their presence at court (for example, by selling houses near the palace to the king when the palace needed to be enlarged.) The family broadened its circle of allies by forging alliances through marriage with other powerful Parisian bourgeois families. Étienne, while not from the wealthiest branch of his family network, was "descended on his mother's side from a line of officers of the royal household and on his father's side from suppliers to the court."

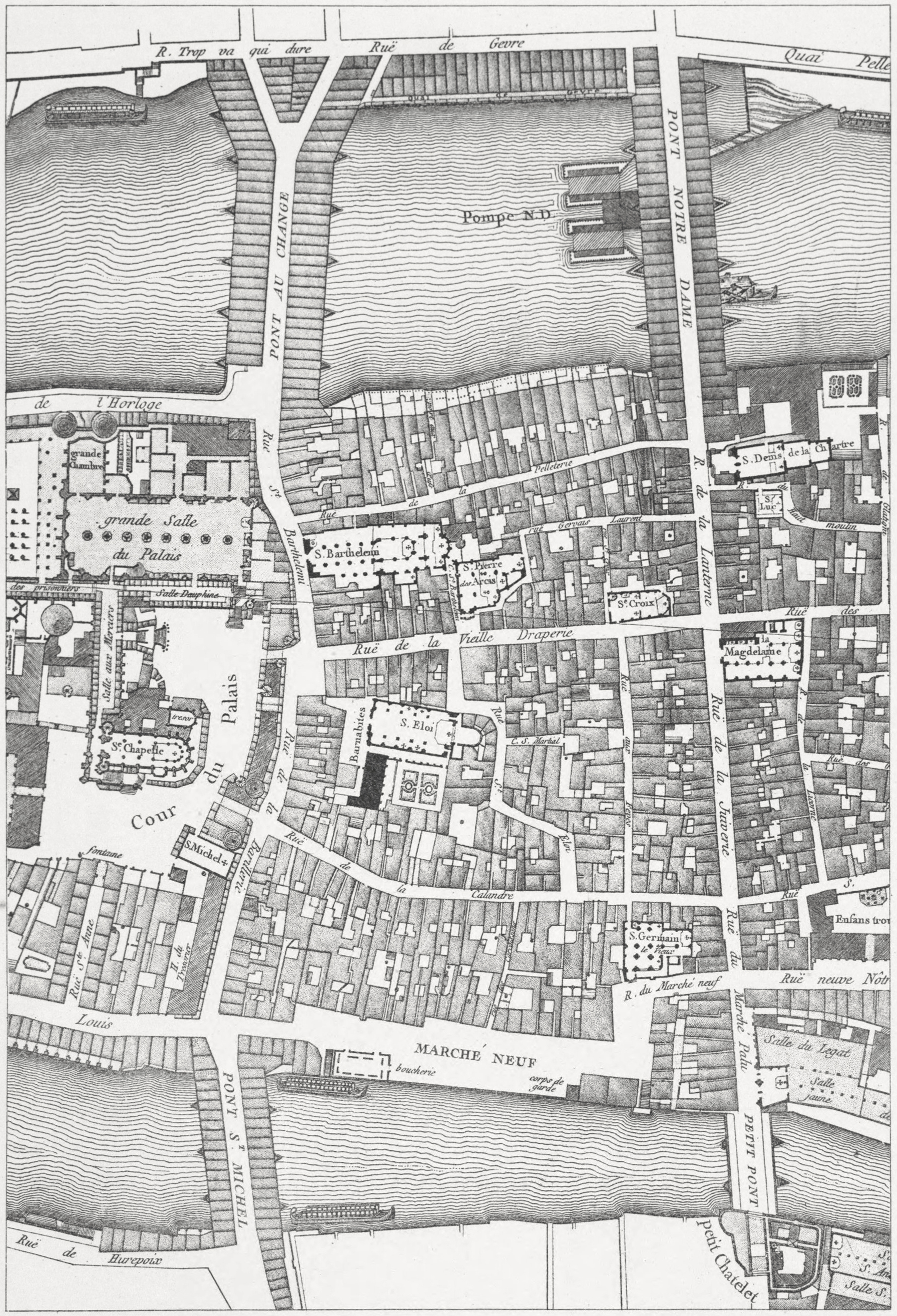
A 1754 map showing the rue de la Vielle-Draperie.

Étienne entered the cloth trade in the 1330s. In partnership with Jean de Saint Benoît, he sold marbled green cloth, imported from Flanders and Brabant, to the court. He married Jeanne de Dammartin, daughter of a wealthy Parisian alderman. His second wife was Marguerite des Essarts, daughter of the powerful banker Pierre des Essarts (d. 1349), whose connections offered Étienne an entry into politics and allowed him to forge new ties with wealthy merchants in the Flemish communes. Étienne owned numerous buildings in Paris and resided on the fr:rue de la Vieille-Draperie, on the Île de la Cité.

== Political career ==
Étienne Marcel became the Provost of the Merchants of Paris (a role akin to mayor) in 1354. In this role, he represented the mercantile leaders of the Third Estate of the Estates-General, The Estates-General was a legislative and consultative assembly of the different classes (or estates) of French subjects. It had a separate assembly for each of the three estates (clergy, nobility and commoners), which were called and dismissed at the will of the king. Its role was purely advisory — unlike the English Parliament, it was not required to approve royal taxation or legislation. One of Marcel’s earliest meetings of the Estates-General – that of 1355 – sought greater control of the kingdom's finances.

Marcel’s political career gained greater prominence following the French defeat by the English at the Battle of Poitiers in 1356 during the Hundred Years' War. With King John II captured by the English, France was left in the hands of his 18 year-old son, the Dauphin Charles (later King Charles V). Seizing this moment of royal weakness, Marcel positioned himself as the leader of the Parisian bourgeoisie and a champion of reform.

== Bid for power ==
With King John a prisoner of the English, the Dauphin Charles, summoned the Estates General on 17 October 1356. In conjunction with Robert le Coq, Bishop of Laon, Marcel played a leading role in this assembly. A committee of 80 members, formed by the two, presented petitions to the Dauphin, denouncing the bad government of the realm and demanding the banishment of the royal councillors accused of debasing the currency. Faced with such demands, the Dauphin dismissed the assembly. Meanwhile, to protect the eastern approach to Paris, Marcel – in his role as Provost – built a fortified gateway into Paris (the original Bastille).

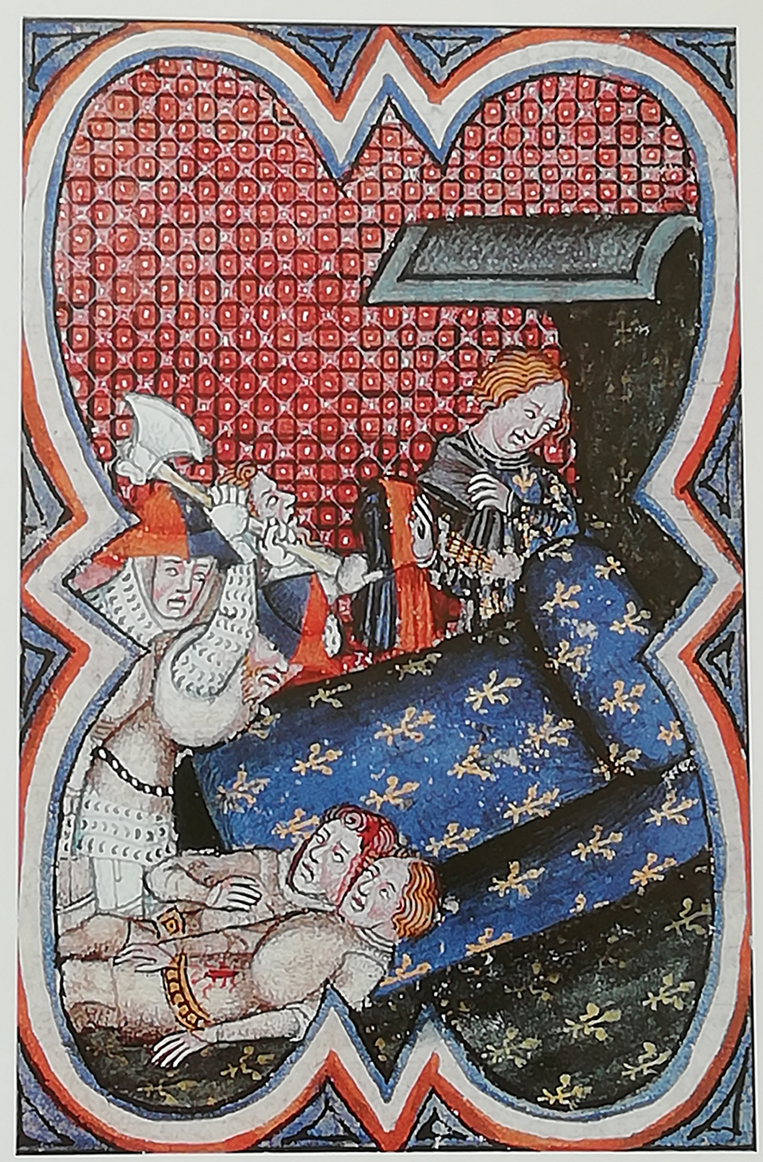
In the foreground, the murder of the two marshals. In the background, Étienne Marcel offers a red and blue hood to the Dauphin Charles while the latter looks away (Grandes Chroniques de France, BnF, ms. français 2813 fº409v, circa 1375-1380).

Financial straits, not the least, dealing with the ransom for King John, forced the Dauphin to summon the Estates-General once more on 3 February 1357. Marcel had ambitious plans for this assembly and, in particular, his objectives were in line with popular sentiment that the Estates-General should have more decision-making power.

Sensing the weakness of the throne, he forced the Dauphine to sign the Great Ordinance. This document, a draft of which was originally promulgated in 1355, described a vast administrative reform that limited royal power — for the Estates-General, it foresaw financial oversight, regular assembly meetings, and the right to name the royal council (4 members of the clergy, 12 noblemen and 12 commoners). It also required the release of Charles the Bad, King of Navarre, a pretendant to the French crown, and whom King John has thrown in prison for murdering his friend, the Constable Charles of Spain. Charles the Bad was a rival to the French throne who also positioned himself, probably disingenuously, as a friend of the French reformist cause. In return, the Estates agreed to finance an army of 30,000 men.

When the Dauphin tried to back out of the agreement, Marcel incited a popular uprising in Paris. On 22 February the populace of Paris, led by Marcel, invaded the palace and murdered the marshals of Champagne, Jean de Conflans; and of Normandy, Robert de Clermont, before the prince's eyes. Marcel then forced the Dauphin to wear the red and blue hood of the Parisian rebels. The murder of the nobles undermined Marcel's support from the aristocracy.

The Dauphin, confronted with what looked increasingly like a civil war, left Paris in early 1358. In June 1358, he laid siege to the city in order to facilitate his return to the throne. At the same time, Charles, King of Navarre, had access to the city and attempted to convert Parisians to his cause. During this time, the less affluent Parisians were suffering from lack of food because of the blocked roads and surrounding armies – they were more concerned with these problems than with political intrigues and government reform.

Thus, the Dauphin, Charles, who was proving to be a formidable adversary, was now in a position to retake power and save the crown for the Valois line.

== Downfall and murder ==
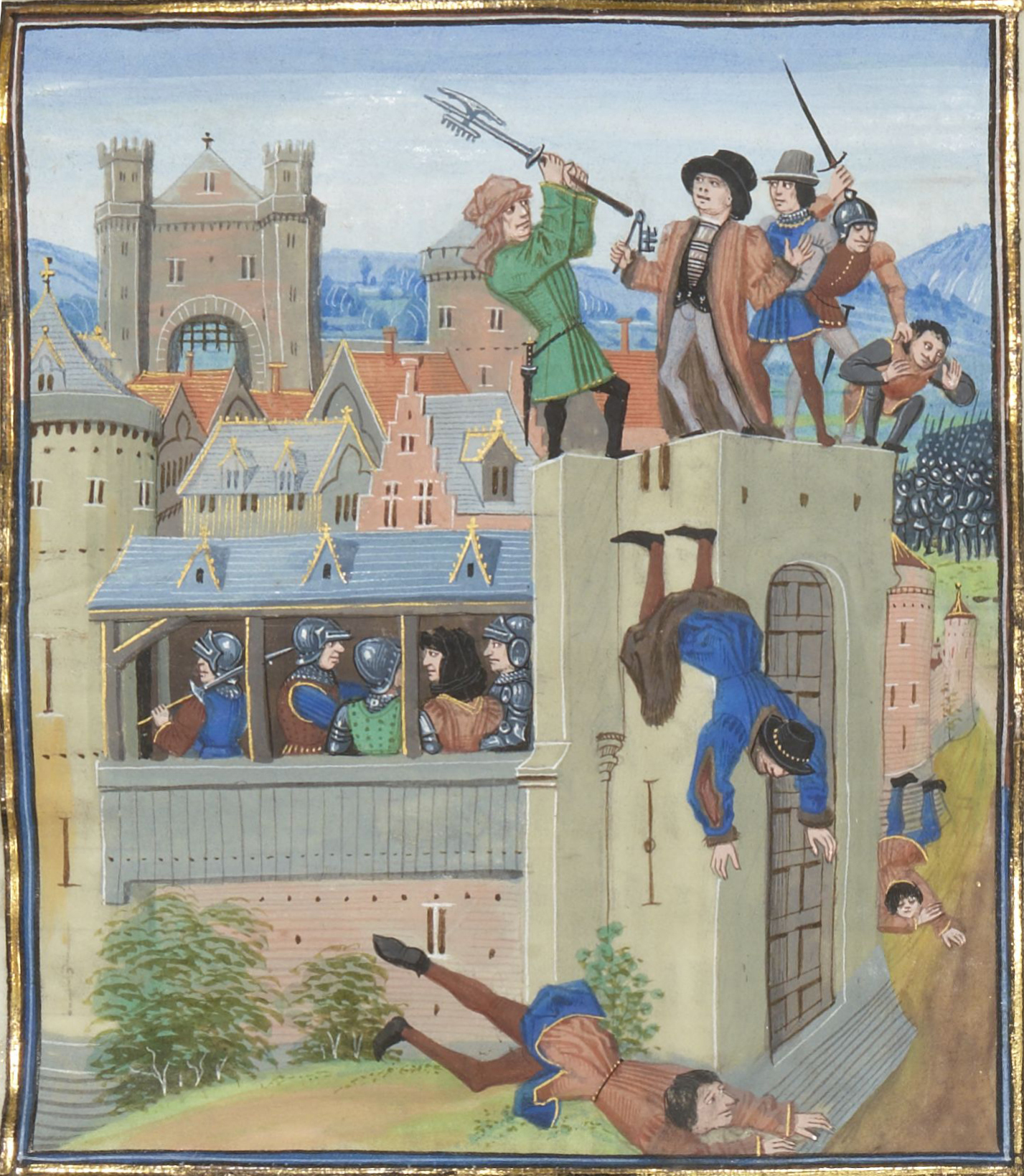
Jean Maillard is depicted killing Étienne Marcel, who is shown holding the keys of Paris.

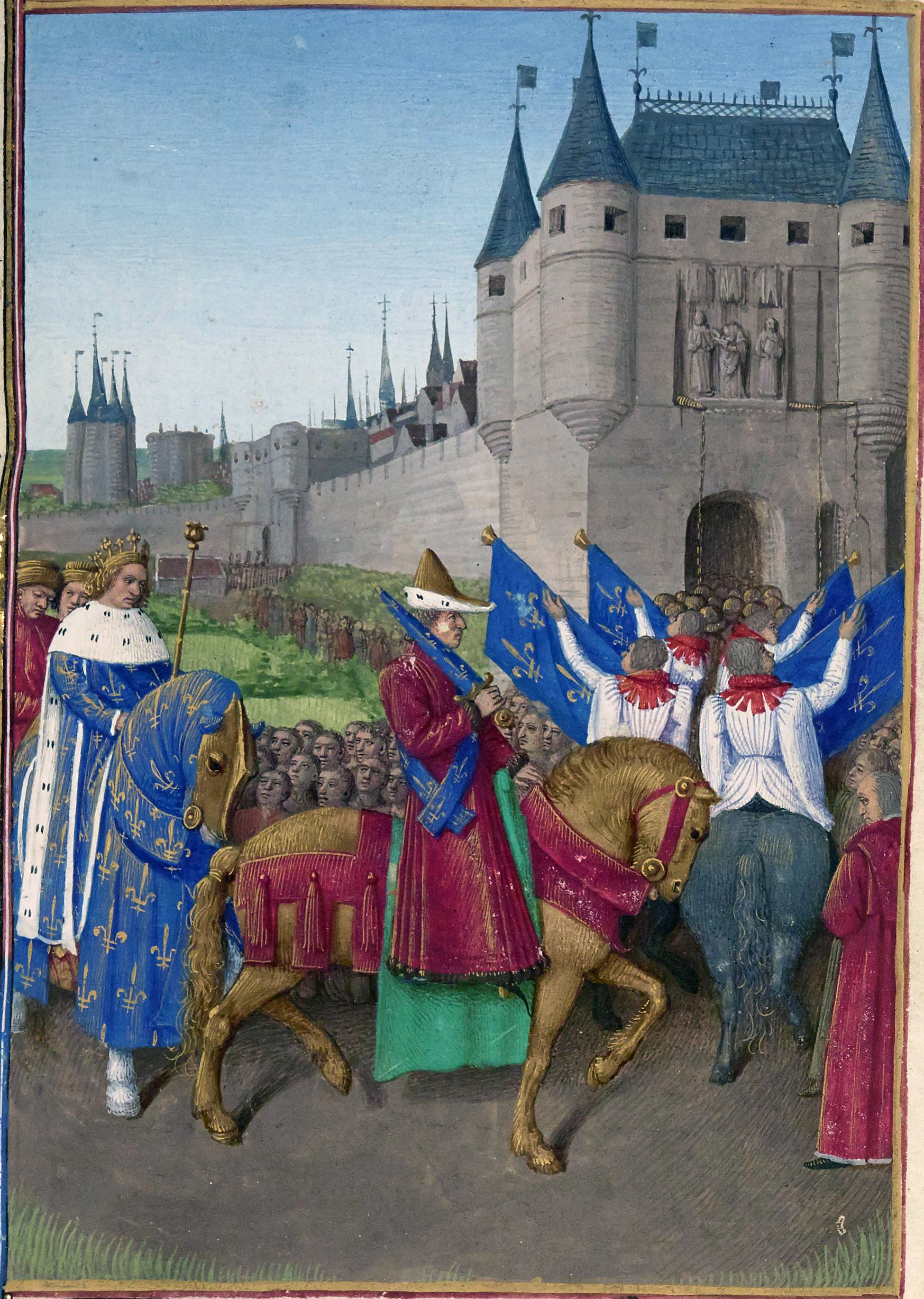
Charles V enters Paris in triumph on August 2, 1358. Miniature by Jean Fouquet from the Grandes Chroniques de France, circa 1455-1460.

Marcel's actions and his increasing political isolation forced him into desperate and unpopular alliances. Marcel knew well that if his bourgeois revolution failed, he would be executed. Realizing the mood of the city had turned against him, Marcel allied himself openly with Charles the Bad, King of Navarre.

Marcel also made a mistake when he let English mercenaries into Paris to bolster his defenses. Fights between the mercenaries and Parisians broke out on 22 July 1358 and the Parisians killed 24 of them. For the citizens of Paris, bringing England's allies into the city crossed the line separating political reform from treason.

On the night of 31 July 1358, and with the agreement of Charles the Bad, Marcel prepared to open the city gates to mercenaries allied with Charles stationed outside. Marcel was about to open the gates of the capital to them, but Jean Maillard prevented this. In the ensuing skirmish, Marcel was killed at the Porte Saint-Antoine.

On 2 August 1358, the Dauphin Charles re-entered Paris in triumph and, shortly thereafter, Marcel’s remaining allies were put to death. The Dauphin then dismantled the reforms Marcel had fought for.
