= John of Valois, Count of Montpensier =

John of Valois
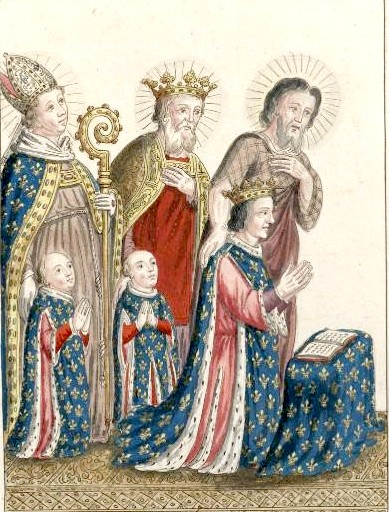
- John and his brother Charles praying behind their father

Count of Montpensier
- Reign: 1386–1401
- Born: 1375/1376
- Died: 1397
- Spouse: Catherine of France; Anne de Bourbon
- House: Valois
- Father: John, Duke of Berry
- Mother: Joan of Armagnac

John of Berry (1375/1376–1397), count of Montpensier (1386–1401), was a French nobleman. He was the son of John, Duke of Berry and Joanna of Armagnac. He had no children and predeceased his father.

He married twice:

1. in 1386 at Saint-Ouen to Catherine of France (1378 † 1388), daughter of Charles V and of Joanna of Bourbon
2. in 1390 to Anne de Bourbon-La Marche (1380–1408), daughter of John I, Count of La Marche and Vendôme, and Catherine de Vendôme.

== Sources ==
- Rohr, Zita Eva (2016). Yolande of Aragon (1381-1442) Family and Power: The Reverse of the Tapestry. Palgrave Macmillan.
