= Joan of Armagnac =

- Duchess of Berry
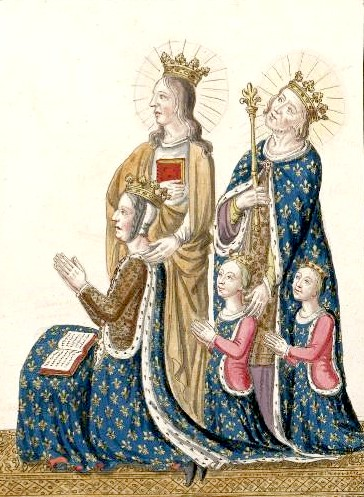
- Joanna and her children
- Born: 24 June 1346
- Died: 1387 (aged 40–41)
- Spouse: John, Duke of Berry
- Issue: Charles of Berry, Count of Montpensier; John of Berry, Count of Montpensier; Louis of Berry; Bonne, Countess of Savoy; Marie, Duchess of Auvergne
- House: Armagnac
- Father: John I of Armagnac
- Mother: Beatrice of Clermont

Joan of Armagnac (French: Jeanne d'Armagnac; 24 June 1346 – 1387) was a French noblewoman of the Armagnac family, being the eldest daughter of Count John I of Armagnac and his wife Beatrice of Clermont. She became Duchess of Berry by her marriage to John, Duke of Berry in 1360.

== Marriage and issue ==
She married John, Duke of Berry, son of John II of France and his first wife Bonne of Bohemia. Joanna and John had five children:

- Charles of Berry, Count of Montpensier (1362–1382)
- John de Valois, Count of Montpensier, (1363–1402), married Princess Catherine of France, daughter of Charles V, King of France
- Louis of Berry (1364–1383)
- Bonne of Berry (1365–1435), married Amadeus VII of Savoy and Bernard VII, Count of Armagnac
- Marie of Berry, Duchess of Auvergne (1367–1434), married: 1) Louis III of Châtillon, 2) Philip of Artois, Count of Eu; 3) John I, Duke of Bourbon

Her daughter, Marie was the mother of Bonne of Artois, second wife to Philip the Good, Duke of Burgundy. Joanna's daughter, also called Bonne, was the mother of Antipope Felix V.

== Sources ==
- Emmerson, Richard K. (2013). Key Figures in Medieval Europe: An Encyclopedia. Routledge. ISBN 978-1136775185.
- Jeanne d'Armagnac
