= André Beauneveu =

French sculptor

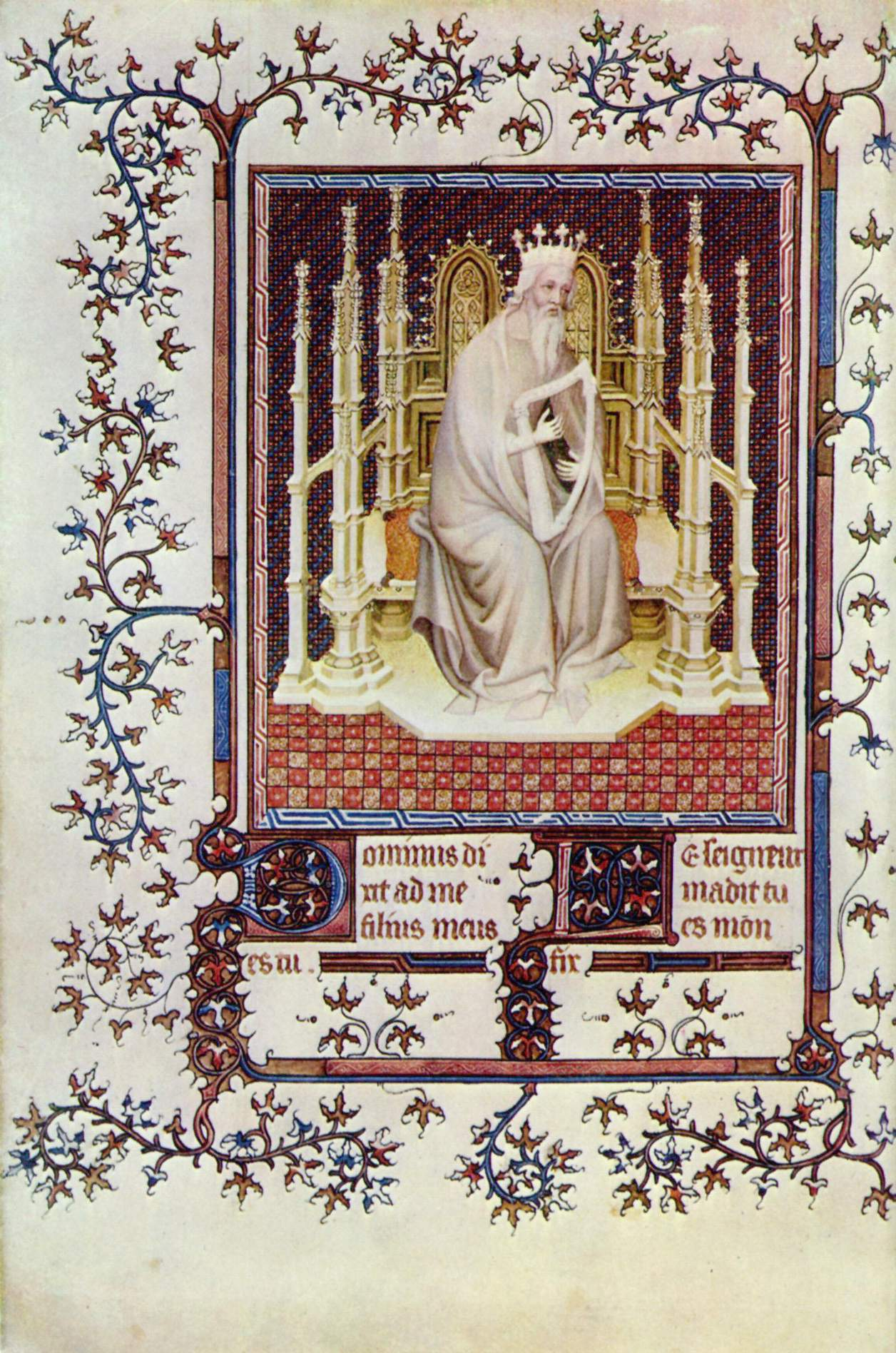
David from the Psalter of Jean de Berry

André Beauneveu (born c. 1335 in Valenciennes, died c. 1400 in Bourges) was an Early Netherlandish sculptor and painter, born in the County of Hainaut (Valenciennes is today in France), who is best known for his work in the service of the French King Charles V, and of the Valois Duke, Jean de Berry. His work in all media shows a generally naturalistic and 'sculptural' style, characteristic of the 'Pucellian revival' of the latter 14th century.

== Biography ==
As with all northern European artists of this period, reliable biographical information about Beauneveu is extremely sparse, being mainly limited to a few mentions in the financial accounts of his patrons. The earliest documentary reference to "Master Andrew the Painter" (assumed to be Beauneveu) appears in the accounts of Duchess Yolande de Bar in 1359, where he is recorded as working on the decoration of a chapel in her castle at Nieppe (destroyed). By 1364 he was in Paris, as part of an extensive artistic workshop employed by King Charles V, who refers to him as our esteemed Andreu Bauneveu our sculptor (see below for details of the work he undertook for the King).

No documentary evidence survives for Beauneveu's whereabouts between 1367 and 1372. It has been suggested, based on comments by his contemporary and fellow Valenciennois Jean Froissart, that some or all of this period may have been spent in England, possibly working with Jean de Liege in the employ of Philippa of Hainault. However, there is no independent evidence for such a visit and Beauneveu's name does not appear anywhere in the normally comprehensive Westminster account rolls for this period. By 1372, Beauneveu was back in the Low Countries, where he worked for a number of civic and aristocratic patrons.

In 1386 he made the move to Bourges to enter the service of one of the greatest artistic patrons of medieval Europe, the Valois Duke Jean de Berry. Beauneveu was employed as Berry's Superintendent of all Painting and Sculpture and seems to have been particularly associated with the Duke's new 'fairy-tale' castle at Mehun-sur-Yèvre and with the stained glass and sculptural decorations for the chapel of his palace in Bourges.

There are no dated references to Beauneveu's life after 1388 but it is generally assumed that he died some time around 1400.

== Manuscript illumination ==
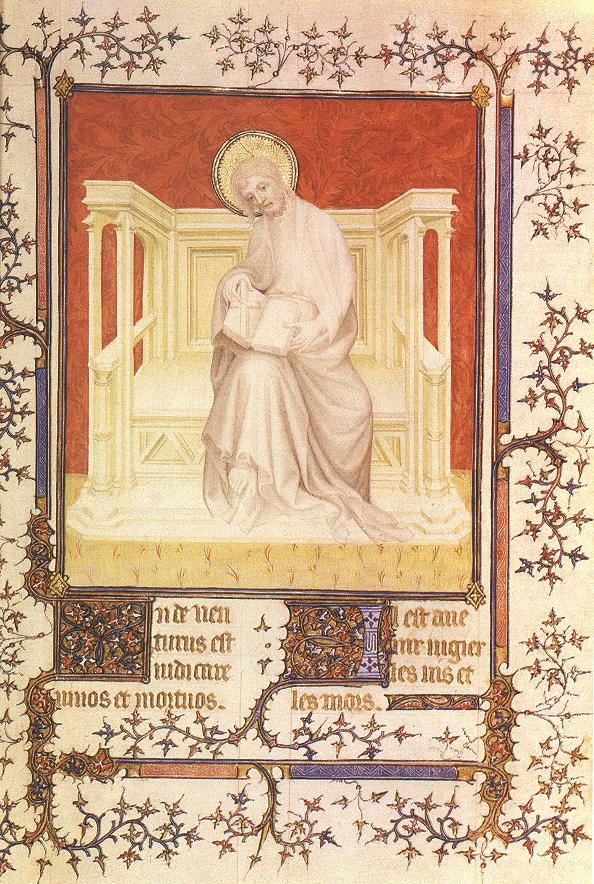
St Philip from Paris BNF MS.fr.13091, c.1390

One of the few firmly attributable works by the hand of Beauneveu is the Psalter of Jean de Berry (Paris, Bibliothèque Nationale, MS. fr. 13091), which is mentioned as being the work of the artist in a 1402 inventory of the ducal treasury. Beauneveu's contribution to this illuminated manuscript was a series of 24 full-page miniatures of enthroned prophets and apostles. The prophets and apostles face each other across 12 openings, giving the appearance of a succession of diptychs. The figures themselves are painted in grisaille and both they and the elaborate thrones on which they sit show evidence of a keen interest in realistic three-dimensional modelling and foreshortening. The style of the miniatures clearly show the influence of Jean Pucelle, whose most famous work, the Hours of Jeanne d'Evreux, was in the possession of the Duc de Berry by this time.

== Sculpture ==
In 1364 Beauneveu was commissioned by King Charles V to sculpt four marble effigies for new tombs for his paternal grandparents, King Philip VI and Queen Joan of Burgundy, his father King John II of France and himself. These tombs were destined for the Abbey of St Denis, where the French kings were traditionally buried. By creating spectacular tombs for his immediate ancestors as well as himself and placing them at the heart of the Capetian royal necropolis, Charles was seeking to assert the authority of the new Valois dynasty as the rightful inheritors of the French crown - his Burgundian cousins began a new dynastic necropolis at Champmol a decade later. Charles' choice of Beauneveu for this most important of commissions (for which the artist was paid 4,700 gold francs) clearly indicates the Netherlandish artist's status in France at this time.

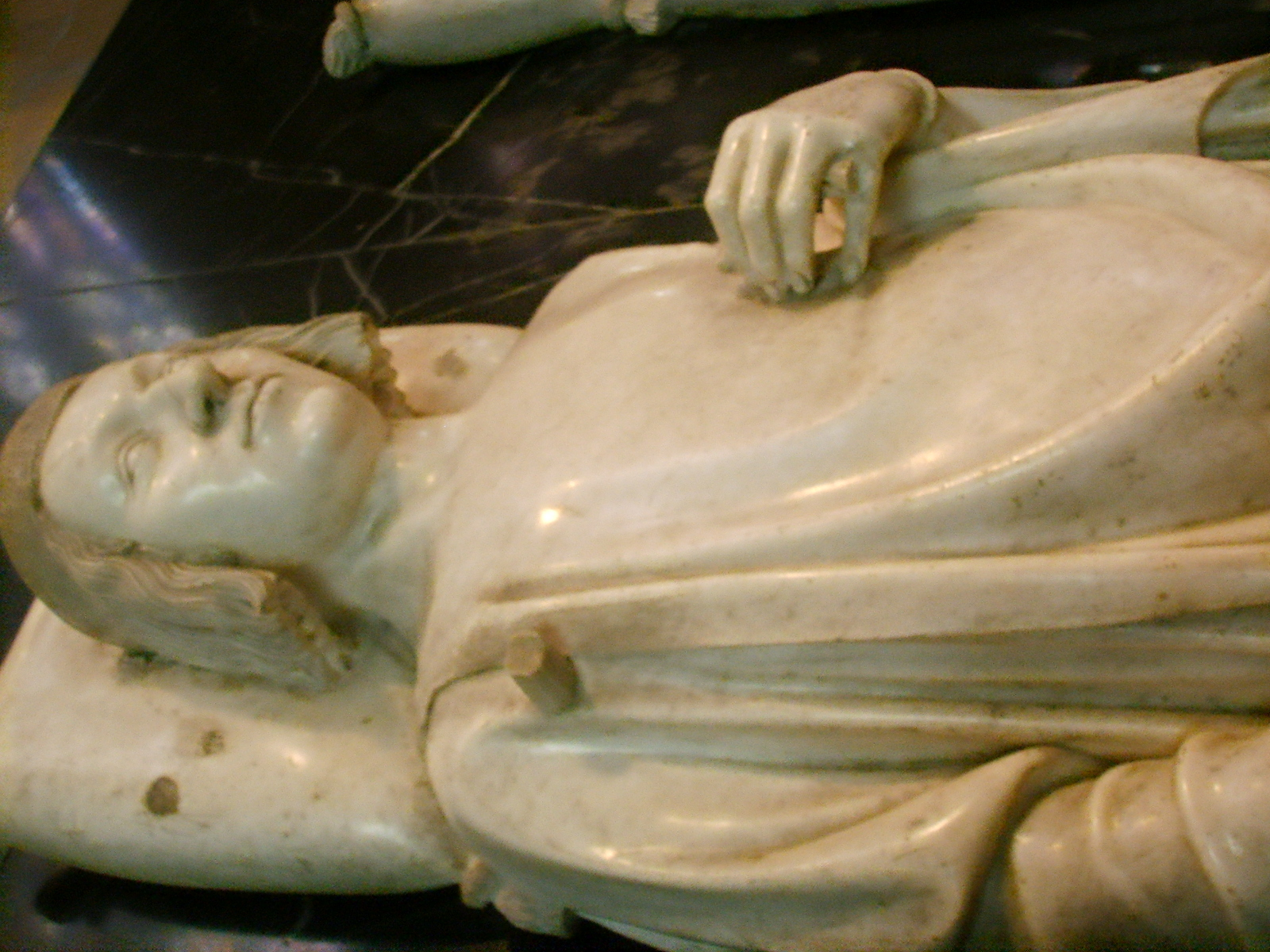
Beauneveu's effigy of King Charles V in the Abbey Church of St Denis. c.1366

The tombs were designed in the latest style, with brilliant white marble gisants (recumbent effigies representing the deceased) resting on polished black marble slabs (although the tombs themselves were destroyed in 1793, their form is known from late 17th century drawings commissioned by Roger de Gaignières. The surviving gisants are still at St Denis but mounted on plain bases). The effigy of the King is shown as if still alive (representacion au vif) and with its highly personalised features it is clearly in a different league from the other surviving effigies of this group, which seem to have been undertaken by other members of Beauneveu's workshop. Records of payments to Beauneveu from the royal coffers cease in 1366 and the project was then completed by other hands, including his contemporary Jean de Liège.

In 2017, two marble lions from the destroyed tomb of Charles V of France made £9.3 million at a Christie's auction.

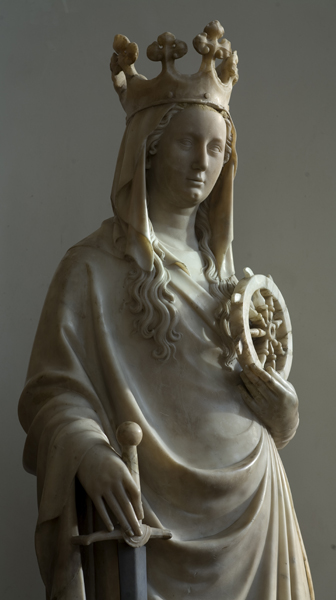
St. Catherine (Kortrijk)

One of the projects in which Beauneveu was engaged between 1374 and 1377 was a funeral monument for the Count of Flanders, Louis of Male. The project was never finished but a statue of St Catherine that was to form part of the supporting structure survives at the Onze Lieve Vrouwkerk in Kortrijk. This lifelike figure, with her gently curving pose, naturalistic features and direct gaze, gives a clear sense of the elegance that Froissart and his contemporaries so admired in Beauneveu's work.

During his time in the employ of Jean de Berry (after 1386), Beauneveu is known to have produced several sculptures for the castle at Mehun and for the chapel of the ducal palace at Bourges. The only surviving fragment from Mehun is the large bearded head which is now in the Musée de Louvre. This probably belonged to one of twelve apostle statues that would have stood against the pillars inside the palace chapel at Mehun (similar to the ones in the Ste Chapelle in Paris). Some have argued that the head is the work of Beauneveu's successor, Jean de Cambrai, though the weight of opinion generally favours Beauneveu or his workshop.

The work that Beauneveu carried out on the sculptural and painted decorations at Mehun was so highly regarded by his contemporaries that Jean de Berry's brother, Philip of Burgundy, sent his own court artists Claus Sluter and Jean de Beaumetz to visit the building site in 1393.

Several of the smaller prophet figures from Bourges also survive, dispersed amongst public and private collections. Stylistic differences between these figures serve as a useful reminder that northern European sculpture of this period was normally a team effort. Workshop masters like Beauneveu would set the standard and dictate the overall style but on any large project, one can usually distinguish the presence of multiple distinct craftsmen.

== Painting and stained glass ==
Archives show that during the 1370s, whilst working on the funereal sculptures for the Count of Flanders, Beauneveu was also supplying paintings for the Alderman's hall in his home town of Valenciennes as well as undertaking various commissions for the town councils of Ypres and Mechelen, though none of these works nor any other panel paintings by the artist survive.

In the early 20th century, the newfound interest in Gothic art and the obsession with attributing anonymous works to named artists led some authors to cite Beauneveu as the creator of numerous late 14th century artworks, including the Hakendover Altarpiece and the Parement de Narbonne. The English bibliophile S.C. Cockerell even claimed that Beauneveu had painted the famous 'Westminster' portrait of Richard II, based on a supposed similarity between that work and the Berry Psalter. For a period, Beauneveu's supposed oeuvre was a pawn in the gentlemanly disputes (played out in the pages of the Burlington Magazine) between Cockerell, Martin Conway and Roger Fry over the origins of the French, Netherlandish and English 'schools' of late medieval art. These attributions were however based on nothing more than superficial stylistic resemblances which could equally have applied to almost any work of the International Gothic period. The fact that all these speculative attributions have since been dismissed in the light of more careful scholarship shows the dangers of trying to apply traditional techniques of connoisseurship to the art of this period.

Some of the few examples of Beauneveu's large-scale painting that can be safely attributed on the basis of documentary evidence, as well as stylistic considerations, are the stained glass windows he designed for Jean de Berry's 'Sainte Chapelle' (the palace chapel built in Bourges in emulation of Louis IX's Ste Chapelle in Paris). Although the Duke's chapel was destroyed during the French Revolution its appearance is known from an 18th-century oil painting, which is now in the Musée du Berry in Bourges along with various sculptural fragments from the chapel. Some of the windows survived the destruction and were subsequently installed in the crypt of Bourges Cathedral. These spectacular grisaille panels show a series of naturalistic standing prophets, set within microarchitectural niches, which would have echoed the real sculpted prophets mounted in niches on the outside of the building.
