= Joanna of Bourbon =

Queen of France from 1364 to 1378

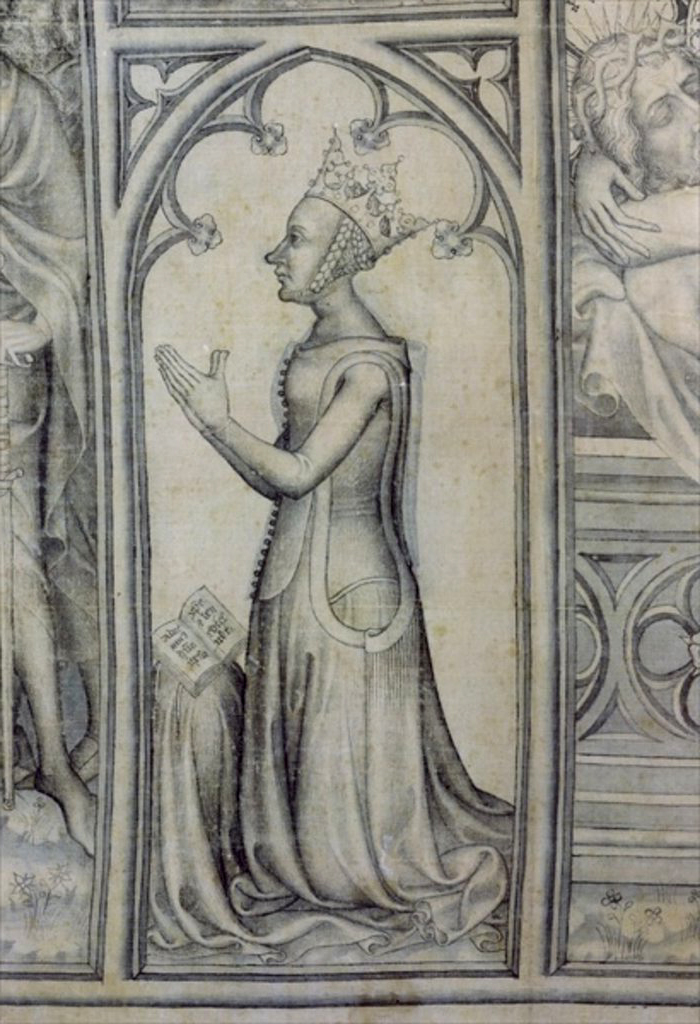
- Joanna in the Parement de Narbonne, c. 1375

Queen consort of France
- Tenure: 8 April 1364 – 6 February 1378
- Coronation: 1 June 1364
- Born: 3 February 1338; Vincennes, France
- Died: 6 February 1378 (aged 40); Paris, France
- Burial: Basilique Saint-Denis
- Spouse: Charles V of France (m. 1350)
- Issue: Joanna of France; Bonne of France; Joanna of France; Charles VI, King of France; Maria Of France; Isabella of France; John of France; Louis I, Duke of Orléans; Catherine, Countess of Montpensier
- House: Bourbon
- Father: Peter I, Duke of Bourbon
- Mother: Isabella of Valois

Joanna of Bourbon (Jeanne de Bourbon; 3 February 1338 – 6 February 1378) was Queen of France by marriage to King Charles V. She acted as his political adviser and was appointed potential regent in case of a minor regency.

== Life ==
=== Early life ===
Born in the Château de Vincennes, Joanna was a daughter of Peter I, Duke of Bourbon, and Isabella of Valois, a half-sister of King Philip VI of France.

From October 1340 through at least 1343, negotiations and treaties were made for Joanna to marry Amadeus VI, Count of Savoy. The goal was to bring Savoy more closely under French influence. Following this, her betrothal to Humbert II, Dauphin of Viennois, also fell through.

=== Queen ===
Arms of Joanna as Queen consort of France

On 8 April 1350, Joanna married her cousin, the future King Charles V of France, at Tain-l'Hermitage. Since they were first cousins once removed, their marriage required a papal dispensation. Born thirteen days apart, they both were 12 years old. When Charles ascended the throne in 1364, Joanna became Queen consort of France. Charles sometimes confided in Joanna on political and cultural issues and relied on her advice.

Joanna was described as mentally fragile, and after the birth of her son Louis in 1372, she suffered a complete mental breakdown. This deeply worried Charles V, who made a pilgrimage and offered many prayers for her recovery. When she did recover and regained her normal state of mind in 1373, Charles V appointed her legal guardian of the heir to the throne should he die when his son and heir was still a minor.

=== Death and burial ===
Joanna died at the royal residence Hôtel Saint-Pol in Paris, on 6 February 1378 three days after her 40th birthday, and two days after the birth of her youngest child, Catherine. Historian Jean Froissart recorded that Joanna took a boiling bath against her physicians' advice. Soon after, she went into labour and died two days after giving birth. The king was devastated. Her heart was buried in the Cordeliers Convent and her entrails in the Couvent des Célestins. The Couvent des Célestins in Paris was the most important royal necropolis after the Basilica of Saint-Denis. The rest of her remains were then placed at the basilica.

== Issue ==
Joanna and Charles had eight or nine children. Two of them reached adulthood:

1. Joanna (end September 1357 (Note: News of "l’accouchement madame la duchesse de Normandie" was brought to her husband on 30 September 1357.) – 21 October 1360, Saint Antoine-des-Champs Abbey, Paris (Note: An epitaph at Saint-Antoine-des-Champs records the death at the Abbey on 21 October 1360 of "madame Jehanne aisnée fille de Monsieur Charles, aisné filz du roy de France régent le Royaume...")), interred at Saint-Antoine-des-Champs Abbey.
2. Bonne (1358 – 7 November 1360, Palais Royal, Paris (Note: An epitaph at Saint-Antoine-des-Champs records the death "au palais" on 7 November 1360 of "madame Bonne seconde fille de Monsieur Charles, aisné filz du roy de France régent le Royaume...".)), interred beside her older sister. (Note: The Chronique des règnes de Jean II et de Charles V records the burial on 12 November 1360 of "les deux filles du duc de Normandie" at "Saint-Anthoine près de Paris".)
3. Joanna (Château de Vincennes, 6 June 1366 (Note: The Chronique des règnes de Jean II et de Charles V records that 7 June 1366 "la royne de France...Jehanne fille du duc de Bourbon" gave birth to "une fille au Bois de Vincennes...Jehanne".) – 21 December 1366, Hôtel de Saint-Pol, Paris (Note: The Chronique des règnes de Jean II et de Charles V records the death on 21 December 1366 of "madame Jehanne fille du...roy de France Charles...en l’ostel de la Conciergerie de l’ostel du Roy...près de Saint-Pol" and her burial "en l’eglise Saint-Denis en France".)), interred at Saint Denis Basilica.
4. Charles VI (3 December 1368 – 22 October 1422), King of France from 1380 to 1422.
5. Marie (Paris, 27 February 1370 – June 1377, Paris).
6. Louis (13 March 1372 – 23 November 1407), Duke of Orléans, assassinated in 1407 by the Duke of Burgundy's hitmen.
7. Isabella (Paris, 24 July 1373 – 23 February 1378, Paris).
8. John (1374/76 – died young). (Note: Le Laboureur records that Charles V had "trois fils, dont le dernier nommé Jean estant mort en enfance", adding that "il n’en est fait aucune mention dans les histoires" but without noting his own source on which he bases the information.)
9. Catherine (Paris, 4 February 1378 – November 1388, buried at Abbaye De Maubuisson, France), m. John of Valois, Count of Montpensier (son of John, Duke of Berry).

== Sources ==
- Cox, Eugene L. (1967). The Green Count of Savoy. Princeton, New Jersey: Princeton University Press. p. 57. LCCN 67-11030.
- Delachenal, Roland (1910). Chronique des règnes de Jean II et de Charles V: 1364-1380 (in French). Paris: H. Laurens.
- Guicciardini, Francesco (1969). The History of Italy. Translated by Alexander, Sidney. Princeton University Press.
- Hand, Joni M. (2013). Women, Manuscripts and Identity in Northern Europe, 1350-1550. Ashgate Publishing.
- Keane, Marguerite (2016). Material Culture and Queenship in 14th-century France: The Testament of Blanche of Navarre (1331–1398). Brill.
- Le Laboureur, Jean (1663). Histoire De Charles VI. Roy de France (in French). Paris: Billaine.
- Petit, Ernest [in French] (1905). Histoire des ducs de Bourgogne de la race Capétienne (in French). Paris: Libraire Le Chevalier.
- Raunié, Émile (1890). "Épitaphier du vieux Paris". Histoire générale de Paris (in French). Paris: Impr. nationale. OCLC 910306761.
- Tuchman, Barbara W. (2011). A Distant Mirror: The Calamitous 14th Century. Random House Publishing Group.

Joanna of Bourbon House of Bourbon Cadet branch of the Capetian dynasty Born: 3 February 1338 Died: 6 February 1378
French royalty
Vacant Title last held by Joanna I of Auvergne	Queen consort of France; 1364–1378	Vacant Title next held by Isabeau of Bavaria
