= Harelle =

1382 tax revolt in France

The Harelle (French pronunciation: [aʁɛl]; from haro) was a revolt that occurred in the French city of Rouen in 1382, followed by an uprising a few days later in Paris, as well as numerous other revolts across France in the subsequent week. France was in the midst of the Hundred Years' War, and had seen decades of warfare, widespread destruction, high taxation, and economic decline, made worse by bouts of plague. In Rouen, the second largest city in the kingdom, the effects of the war were particularly felt.

Tensions had been building nationally for nearly a year following the death of King Charles V in 1380; on his deathbed he repealed many of the war taxes he had previously imposed. With their re-imposition months later, a localized revolt, led by Rouen's guilds, occurred in the city and was followed by many similar such incidents across France. The new king, Charles VI, accompanied troops led by his uncle and regent, Philip the Bold, Duke of Burgundy, from Paris. Paris itself revolted shortly after the army left the city. The duke's army quickly turned back to crush the rebels in Paris before resuming its original march to Rouen. The leaders of the Harelle in Rouen feared execution on the scale that occurred in Paris and resolved to not resist the army. Twelve leaders of the revolt were executed, the city was stripped of its independent councils and placed under royal governorship, and a fine of 100,000 francs was imposed. Despite the victory, the King was unable to re-enforce the taxation that prompted the Harelle and would spend much of the new two years suppressing other revolts that had sprung up in its wake. The Harelle was one of many popular revolts in late medieval Europe, including the English peasants' revolt of 1381 one year earlier, all part of a larger crisis of the Late Middle Ages.

== Background ==
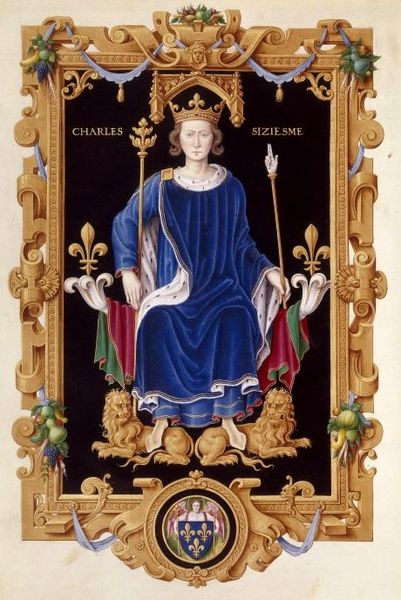
Charles VI of France

Charles V, King of France died in 1380 and on his deathbed repealed all of the royal taxes at the suggestion of his confessor, to better prepare his soul for the afterlife. France was in the midst of the Hundred Years War with England. The kingdom was entirely dependent upon heavy taxation for the prosecution of the war effort; their repeal led to an immediate suspension of fighting as there was no money to pay for it. Complicating matters was that Charles' successor, Charles VI, was a minor and was under the regency of his three uncles, the Dukes of Burgundy, Berry, and Anjou. The Duke of Anjou was the senior regent, but he was easily cowed by Burgundy and Berry. Plague and war had ravaged the kingdom, while the collection of high taxes shrunk the economy and led to a significant rise in poverty. The cities were particularly affected, as they were now flooded with refugees from the ravaged countryside. England was having similar financial difficulties, resulting in the Peasants' Revolt of 1381.

By 1382, an agreement for managing the country had been agreed to, with Philip assuming the responsibilities of sole regent. After several failed attempts to have war taxes reimposed by the councils and estates general of the numerous French principalities, the duke resorted to use of the gabelle, a much hated sales tax on salt, and the aides, a customs duty. Members of the royal estates general were summoned on January 16, 1382, and individually pressured to approve the duke's plans. Under duress they agreed, but the news only gradually became known to the public. Empowered to act, the duke appointed tax farmers to enforce the new taxes.

== Rouen ==
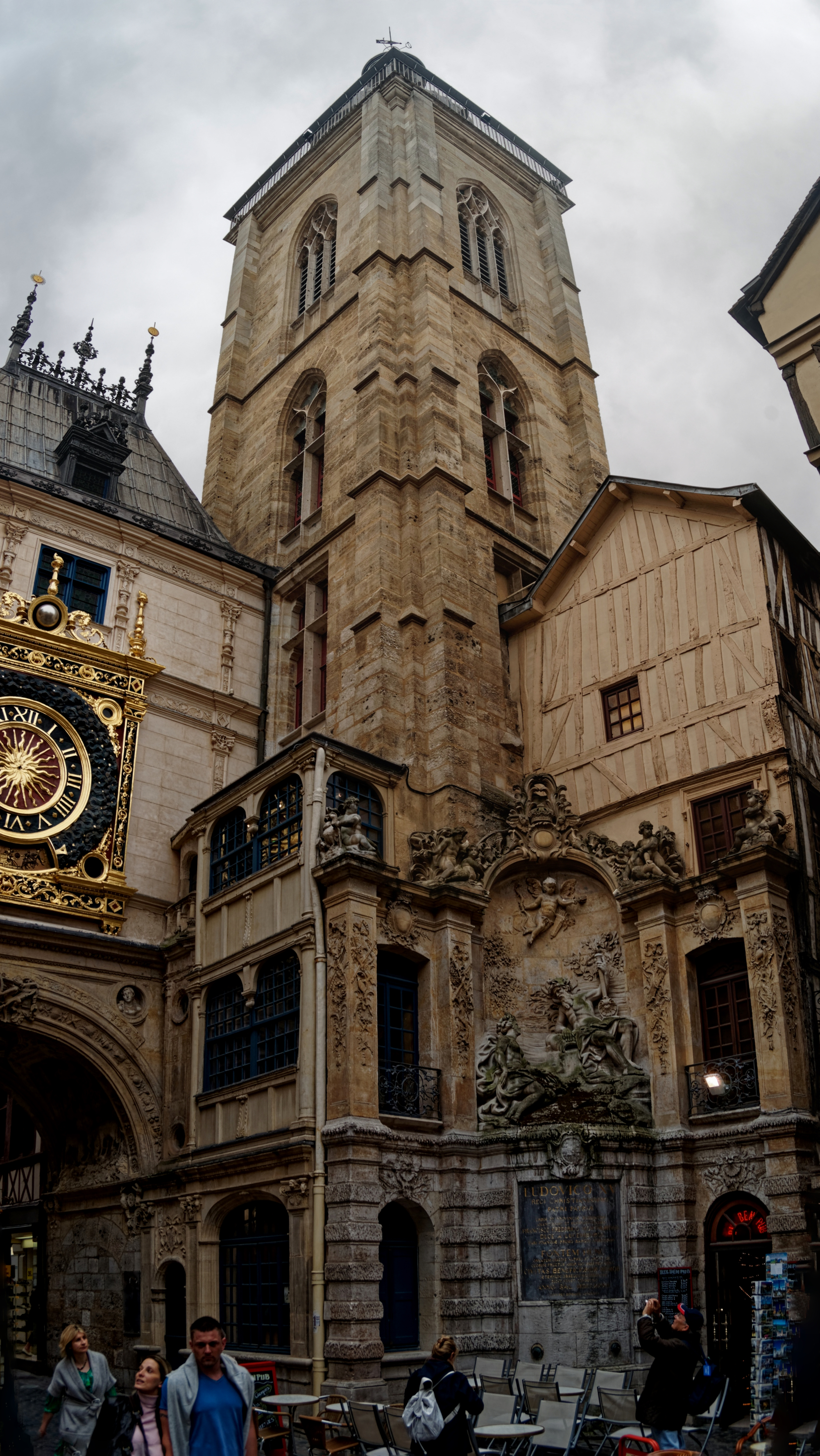
14th century belfry of Rouen Cathedral, built around the time of the Harelle.

The first violence to break out as a result of the re-imposition of taxes occurred in Rouen. On February 24, 1382, a group of men led by draper Jean le Gras, began sounding the great bells of the city's commune. Another group of men seized and closed the gates of the city, and a large mob quickly filled the streets. The mob was drawn largely from the poorest section of the city and was referred to as "la merdaille" (meaning approximately "shit-stinking rabble") by a local chronicler. The initial target of the mob was the wealthy, the town's councilors, the churches, and the tax farmers. Few people were killed, but there was widespread destruction. The mob pillaged every major building in the city, ransacked the courts and the houses of government, and documents listing rents, lawsuits, debts, rights and privileges were destroyed.

A mob left the city and attacked the nearby Abbey of St. Ouen where they destroyed the gallows mounted in front and looted the abbey's records to recover the city's charter, which had been granted by King Louis X after a similar rebellion in 1315. The abbot managed to escape to a nearby castle, but a large part of the abbey was destroyed. The charter was hung from a tall wooden pole and paraded around the city. The city councilors were forced at bladepoint to swear an oath that they would uphold the civil rights promised to Rouen by the charter. The riots lasted three days. The Archbishop of Rouen William V de Lestranges, who held feudal rights over the city, was captured and forced to renounce his claims to the city.

The Duke of Burgundy recruited a small army from the loyal garrisons in and around Paris and set out for Rouen accompanied by Charles VI and several other high officials. After being gone from the city only two days, they learnt that a far more violent revolt had broken out in Paris and had no choice but to return and take action.

== Paris ==
On March 3, 1382 the tax farmers began to collect the new tax in Paris. Violence began in the market of Les Halles. About 500 men seized and lynched the tax farmers. The mob quickly grew into the thousands and attacked the Place de Grève in search of weapons. They located a large store of iron mallets; Jean Froissart coined the term "maillotins", so naming their revolt. The newly armed mob spread out across the city attacking buildings where anything of value was thought to be. Churches, businesses, the homes of the wealthy, and government offices were all looted. The hôtel of the Duke of Anjou was seized and used as a headquarters. The mob lynched wealthy individuals, government officials, merchants, and Jewish moneylenders. The riot quickly degenerated into a pogrom, and the Jewish section of the city was attacked. Hundreds of Jews were murdered, their children forcibly baptized.

The city's royal captain, Maurise de Treseguidy, led his small contingent in an attempt to stem the violence. The mob quickly ran chains across the streets to disable the soldiers' horses and slew them once they were trapped. The city council and most of the King's administration fled Paris and were soon rescued by the royal army. What military forces remained held onto the Grand Châtelet, a fortified royal building in the city.

When the king arrived at the gates of Paris on March 5, 1382, the Duke of Burgundy negotiated with leaders of the mob from the city walls. They offered to submit and allow the king to reenter the city if he met three conditions: abolish all royal taxes, release certain individuals imprisoned by the duke in recent months, and grant amnesty to everyone who had been involved in the Parisian revolt. The duke replied that the King would release the prisoners but not meet their other demands. Fresh violence immediately erupted in the city. The mob attacked the Chatelet and killed several soldiers who were unable to escape. The prisons of the city were opened and everyone released. During the night, however, the mob faded away and leaders of the city's guilds took control of the situation. They too refused to open the gates and offered to negotiate with the King. The King and his army placed Paris under siege and stopped food and supplies from entering. The Duke of Burgundy called on his vassals to send reinforcements, and the Dukes of Brittany and Anjou sent their own forces to assist in suppressing the rebellion.

== Resolution ==
News of the revolts in Rouen and Paris spread across France, and many other places followed suit. Amiens, Dieppe, Falaise, Caen, Orléans, and Rheims were all seized by rebels who followed the pattern established by Rouen and Paris. The cities were looted, the wealthy persecuted, the Jews proscribed, and public records destroyed. More revolts occurred across the south of France, and the Estates of Languedoc who were meeting to consider granting a new tax, dispersed without making the much-needed grant. Phoebus Gaston, Count of Foix, repudiated the lieutenancy of the Duke of Berry over southern France and raised his own army after seizing Toulouse. The largely autonomous areas of Provence, Brittany, and Burgundy, where the royal government had no taxing authority, were the only parts of the country to avoid a revolt. Tax collection became impossible which in turn made raising a substantial army to deal with the rebels nearly impossible, forcing the royal council to compromise. The King agreed to repeal the taxes and offered amnesty to all those involved, but they were required to submit to mediation. After regaining admittance to Paris, the leaders of the Parisian revolt were rounded up and executed.

With control of Paris reestablished, the King and the Duke took the army and again set out for Rouen. The city put up no resistance and opened the gates when the king arrived on March 29, 1382. Their leaders feared execution, but most were spared. Only twelve leaders of the revolt were executed, the city's bells were confiscated, the gates of the city symbolically thrown down, a fine of 100,000 franc was imposed, the city charter was revoked, and Rouen was put under the administration of a royal governor.

The government was unable to reimpose the taxes needed to continue the war effort in the short term, and considerable effort had to be put forth to reassert authority in all the cities where revolts had occurred. The king refused to call a meeting of the Estates General; instead, numerous local councils were summoned to meet in Compiègne, where minor taxation concessions were made to partially fund the war effort. Over the course of the next year the Duke of Burgundy set forth a plan to strengthen the government's position while ordering the continued arrest and execution of his enemies. It was not until 1387 that the last of the issue of taxation was finally resolved, in favor of the king. The collapse of government revenues hastened the government to negotiate the Truce of Leulinghem, a long truce lasting several years with the English while they attempted to reassert their power.

== Sources ==
- Sumption, Jonathan (2009). The Hundred Years War: Divided Houses. University of Pennsylvania Press. ISBN 978-0-8122-4223-2.
