= Catherine of France, Countess of Montpensier =

Countess of Montpensier from 1386 to 1388

Catherine of France
- Countess of Montpensier
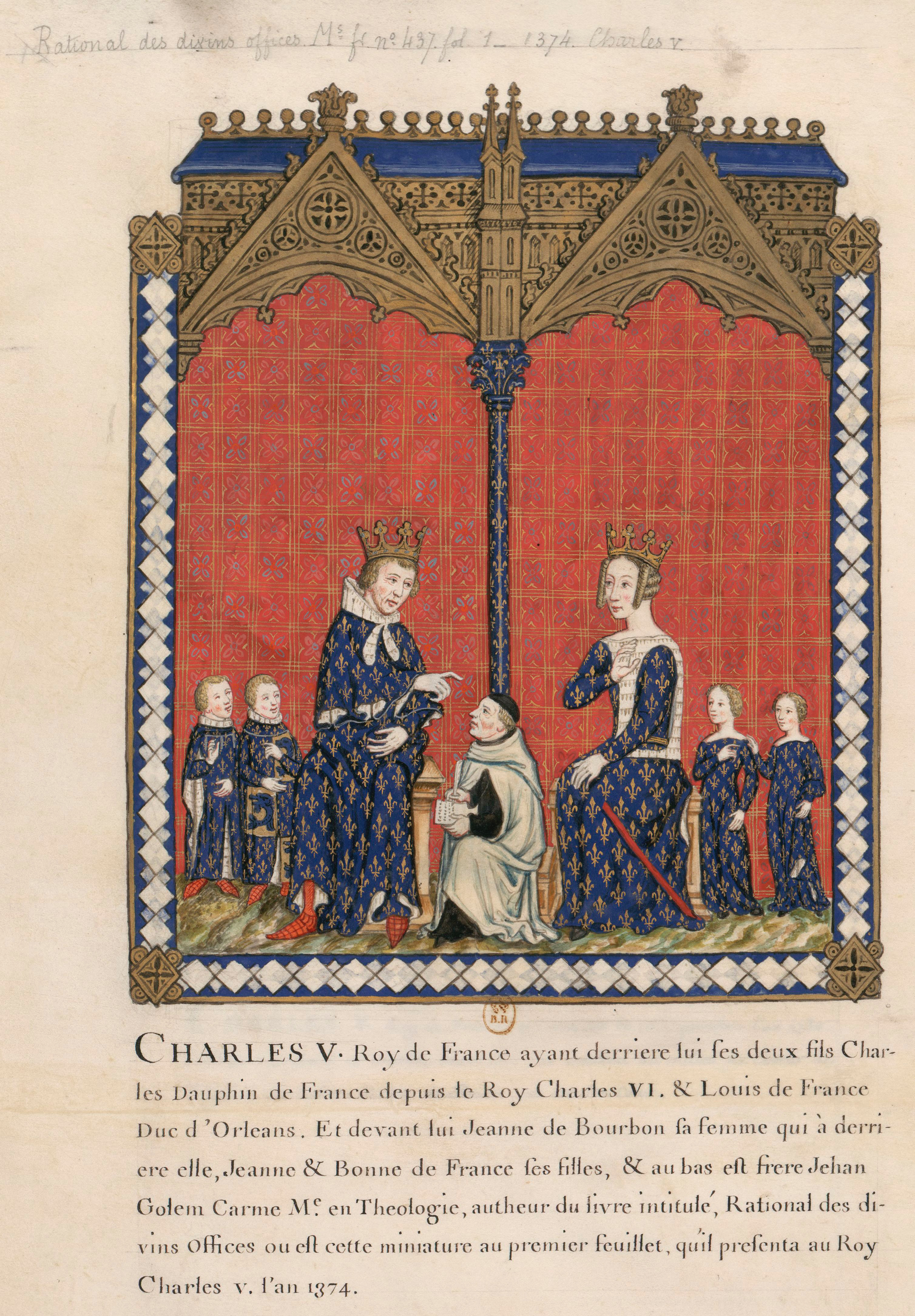
- Born: 4 February 1378; Paris
- Died: November 1388 (aged 10)
- Spouse: John de Valois, Count of Montpensier (m. 1386)
- House: Valois
- Father: Charles V of France
- Mother: Joanna of Bourbon

Catherine of France (4 February 1378 – November 1388) was a princess of France as the daughter of Charles V, King of France, and became the Countess of Montpensier as the wife of John of Berry, Count of Montpensier.

== Life ==
Catherine of France was born in Paris on 4 February 1378 as the ninth child and fifth daughter of Charles V, King of France ("Charles the Wise") and his wife Queen Joanna of Bourbon. Catherine had eight older siblings, only two or three of whom were still alive at the time of her birth: Dauphin Charles (born 1368), Louis of Orleans (born 1372) and maybe John (born 1375). King Charles V died only two years later in 1380, making Catherine's oldest living brother, the 12 year old Dauphin Charles, succeed their father as King Charles VI of France.

In 1386, at the age of eight, Catherine married John of Berry, Count of Montpensier, also known as John of Valois, who was between the ages of nine and eleven. He was the oldest living son and heir of John, Duke of Berry ("John the Magnificent"), and Catherine's first cousin through their shared descent from John II, King of France.

In November 1388, Catherine died at the age of 10 of unknown causes. Her death meant that only two of King Charles V's nine children survived to adulthood and produced offspring: the reigning Charles VI, King of France (who would become the ancestor of the main line of successive Valois kings) and Louis I, Duke of Orléans (who would become the ancestor of the Valois-Orleans cadet branch). As Catherine was only a child at her death, she was unable to have any children with her husband the Count of Montpensier. Two years later Catherine's widower married Anne de Bourbon before his premature death in 1397, predeceasing his father the Duke of Berry.

== Ancestors ==
Ancestors of Catherine of France, Countess of Montpensier

8. Philip VI of France
4. John II of France
9. Joan the Lame
2. Charles V of France
11. John I of Bohemia
5. Bonne of Bohemia
11. Elisabeth of Bohemia
1. Catherine of Valois
12. Louis I, Duke of Bourbon
6. Peter I, Duke of Bourbon
13. Mary of Avesnes
3. Joanna of Bourbon
14. Charles of Valois
7. Isabella of Valois
15. Mahaut of Châtillon

== Sources ==
- Guicciardini, Francesco (1969). The History of Italy. Translated by Alexander, Sidney. Princeton University Press.
