= Louis I of Anjou =

Count of Anjou (1339–1384)

Louis I
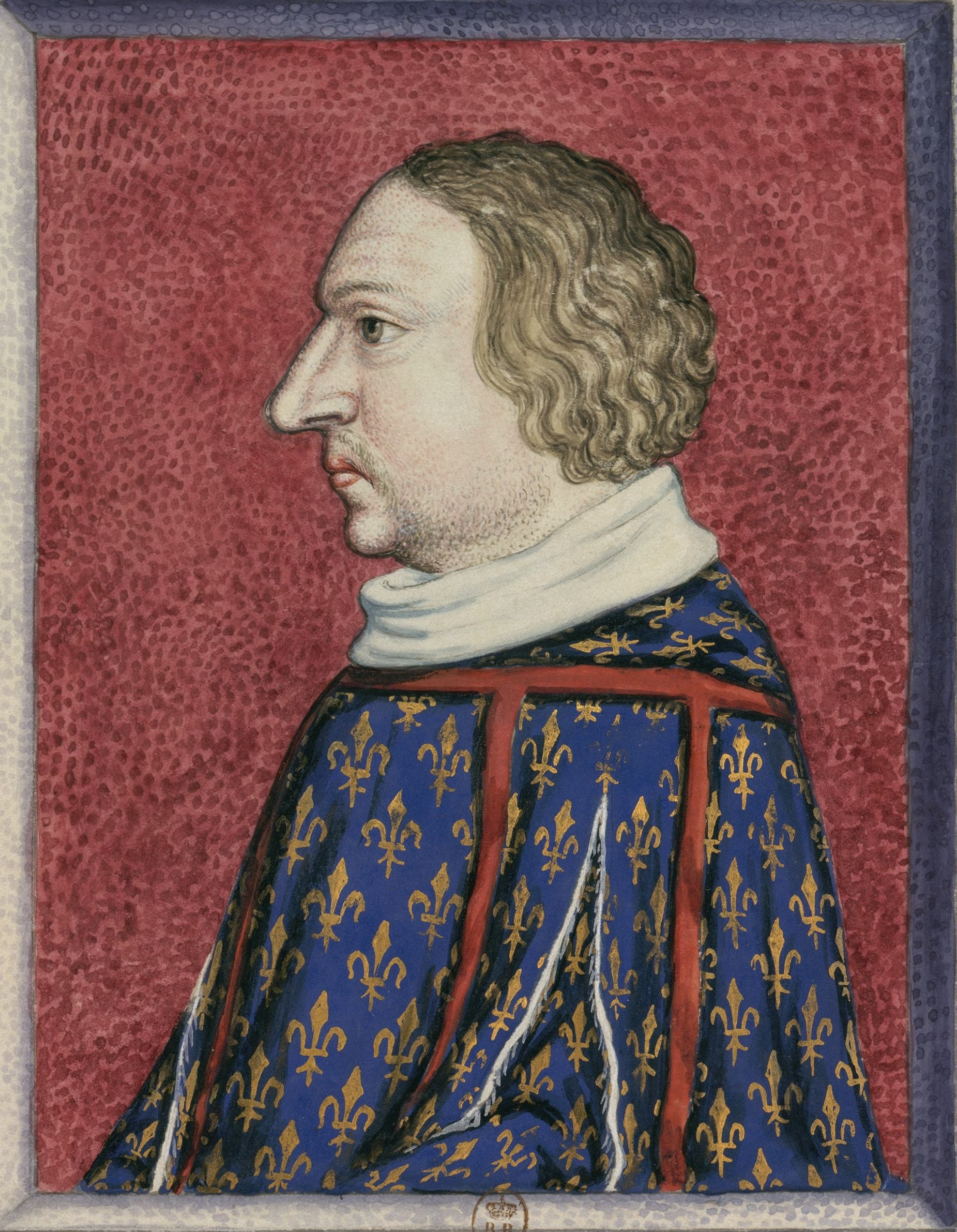
- 17th-century portrait of Louis

Count of Anjou
- Reign: 1356–1360
- Successor: Himself as Duke of Anjou

Duke of Anjou
- Reign: 1360–1384
- Successor: Louis II

Regent of France
- Regency: 1380-1382
- Monarch: Charles VI
- Born: 23 July 1339; Château de Vincennes, Vincennes, France
- Died: 20 September 1384 (aged 45); Bisceglie, Italy
- Spouse: Marie of Blois
- Issue: Louis II of Anjou; Charles, Prince of Taranto
- House: Valois-Anjou
- Father: John II of France
- Mother: Bonne of Bohemia

Louis I of Anjou (23 July 1339 – 20 September 1384) was a French prince, the second son of John II of France and Bonne of Bohemia. His career was markedly unsuccessful. Born at the Château de Vincennes, Louis was the first of the Angevin branch of the Valois royal house. His father appointed him count of Anjou and Maine in 1356, and then duke of Anjou in 1360 and duke of Touraine in 1370.

He fought in the Battle of Poitiers (1356), in which his father the king was captured by the English. In 1360, he was one of a group of hostages the French surrendered to the English in exchange for the king. He escaped from England, after which his father felt bound in honour to return to English custody, where he later died.

In 1382, as the adopted son of Joanna I of Naples, he succeeded to the counties of Provence and Forcalquier. He also inherited from her a claim to the kingdoms of Naples and Jerusalem. He was already a veteran of the Hundred Years' War against the English when he led an army into Italy to claim his Neapolitan inheritance. He died on the march and his claims and titles fell to his son and namesake, Louis II, who succeeded in ruling Naples for a time.

== Hundred Years' War ==
Louis was present at the Battle of Poitiers (1356), in the battalion commanded by his brother Charles, the Dauphin. They hardly fought and the whole group escaped in the middle of the confrontation. Although humiliating, their flight allowed them to avoid capture by the English, who won the battle decisively. King John II and Louis' younger brother Philip were not so fortunate and were captured by the English, commanded by Edward, the Black Prince. Their ransom and peace conditions between France and England were agreed in the Treaty of Brétigny, signed in 1360. Amongst the complicated items of the treaty was a clause that determined the surrender of 40 high-born hostages as guarantee for the payment of the king's ransom. Louis, already Duke of Anjou, was in this group and sailed to England in October 1360. However, France was not in good economic condition and further installments of the debt were delayed. As consequence, Louis was in English custody for much more than the expected six months. He tried to negotiate his freedom in a private negotiation with Edward III of England and, when this failed, decided to escape and returned to France on 1 July 1363. On his return, he met his father's disapproval for his unknightly behavior. John II considered himself dishonored and this, combined with the fact that his ransom payments agreed to in the Treaty of Brétigny were in arrears, caused John to return to captivity in England to redeem his honor.

From 1380 to 1382 Louis served as regent for his nephew, King Charles VI of France.

== King of Naples ==
Louis I of Anjou

In 1382 Louis left France in the latter year to claim the throne of Naples following the death of Queen Joanna I. She had adopted him to succeed her, as she was childless and did not wish to leave her inheritance to any of her close relatives, whom she considered enemies. He was also able to succeed her as count of Provence and Forcalquier. Despite his coronation at Avignon as King of Naples by Antipope Clement VII, Louis was forced to remain in France and Joan's troops were defeated by Charles of Durazzo, her second cousin and previous heir. Joanna was killed in her prison in San Fele in 1382; Louis, with support of the Antipope, France, Bernabò Visconti of Milan and Amadeus VI of Savoy, and using the money he had been able to obtain during the regency, launched an expedition to regain the Kingdom of Naples from Charles.

The expedition, counting to some 40,000 troops, was however unsuccessful. Charles, who counted on the mercenary companies under John Hawkwood for a total of some 14,000 men, was able to divert the French from Naples to other regions of the kingdom and to harass them with guerrilla tactics. Amadeus fell ill and died in Molise on 1 March 1383 and his troops abandoned the field. Louis asked for help from his king nephew in France, who sent him an army under Enguerrand of Coucy. The latter was able to conquer Arezzo and then invade the Kingdom of Naples, but midway was reached by the news that Louis had suddenly died at Bisceglie on 20 September 1384. He soon sold Arezzo to Florence and returned to France.

== Marriage and children ==
On 9 July 1360, without the consent of his father, Louis married Marie of Blois, Lady of Guise, daughter of Charles, Duke of Brittany and Joanna of Dreux. They had the following children:

- Marie (1370 – after 1383)
- Louis II of Anjou (1377 – 1417)
- Charles (1380 – 1404, Angers), Prince of Taranto, Count of Roucy, Étampes, and Gien

== Sources ==
- Bruel, François-L. (1905). "Inventaire de meubles et de titres trouvés au château de Josselin à la mort du connétable de Clisson (1407)". Bibliothèque de l'École des chartes (in French). 66 (66). Librairie Droz: 193–245. doi:10.3406/bec.1905.448236.
- Keane, Marguerite (2016). Material Culture and Queenship in 14th-century France: The Testament of Blanche of Navarre (1331-1398). Brill.
- Rohr, Zita Eva (2016). Yolande of Aragon (1381-1442) Family and Power: The Reverse of the Tapestry. Palgrave Macmillan.
- Sumption, Jonathan (1999). Trial by Fire. The Hundred Years' War. Vol. II. London: Faber and Faber. ISBN 978-0-571-13896-8.

Louis I of Anjou House of Valois-Anjou Cadet branch of the Capetian dynasty
Regnal titles
Vacant Title last held by Charles II	Count of Maine; 1356 – 1384	Succeeded by Louis II
New title	Duke of Anjou; 1360 – 1384	Succeeded by Louis II
Preceded by Joanna I	Count of Provence and Forcalquier; 1382 – 1384	Succeeded by Louis II
Preceded by Joanna I	— TITULAR — King of Naples; 1382 – 1384	Succeeded by Louis II
Preceded by Louis I	Count of Étampes; 1381 – 1384	Vacant Title next held by John I
