= Château de Mehun-sur-Yèvre =

Monument historique in Cher, France

Coordinates: 47°08′35″N 2°13′00″E

- Mehun-sur-Yèvre, France
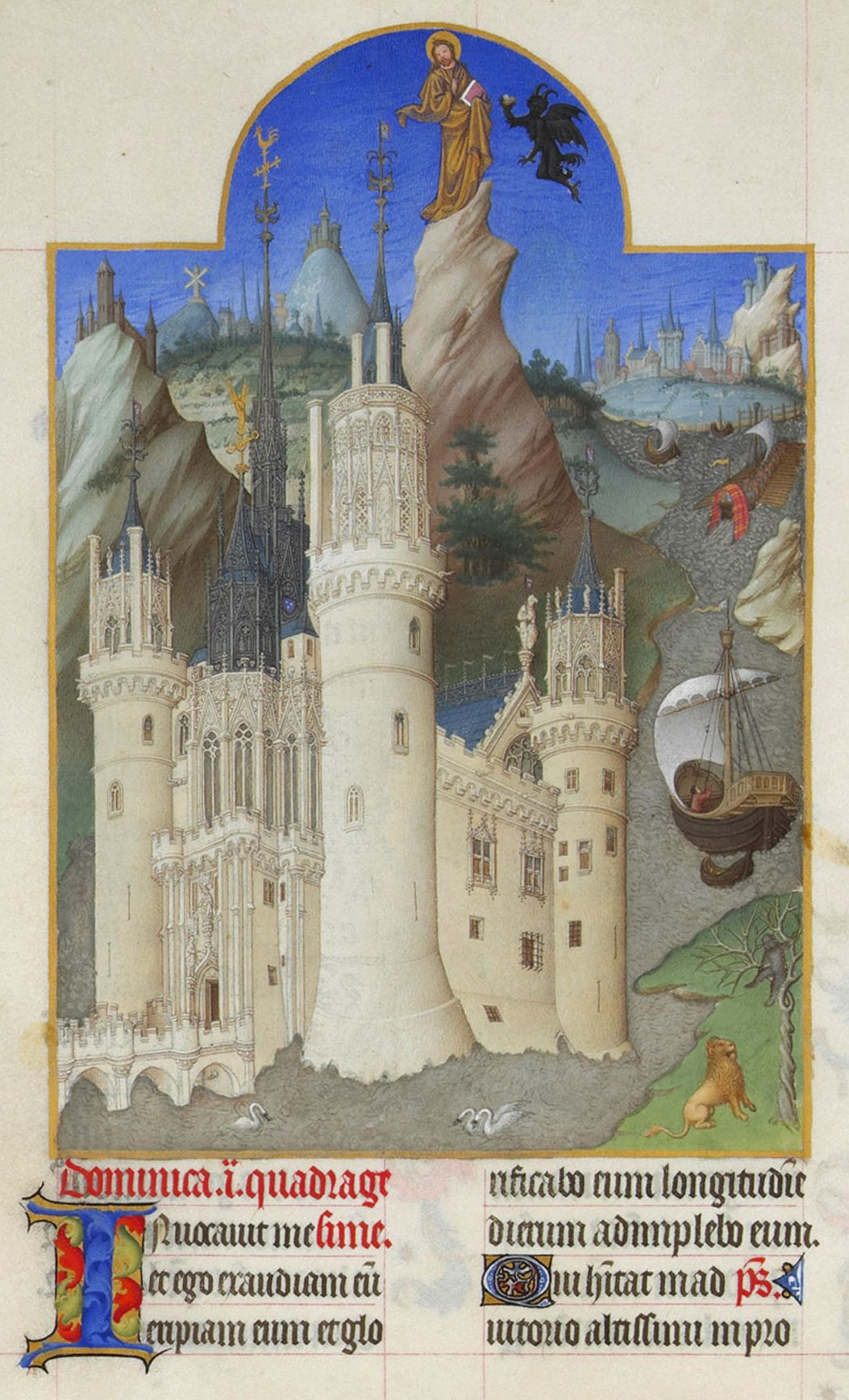
- An illuminated page from the Très Riches Heures du duc de Berry featuring an image of the Château de Mehun-sur-Yèvre, Folio 161v

Site information
- Type: Medieval castle

Site history
- Built: c. 1209
- Built by: House of Courtenay & John, Duke of Berry

The Château de Mehun-sur-Yèvre is a castle in the town of Mehun-sur-Yèvre in the department of Cher, France.

The castle has been classified as a monument historique by the French Ministry of Culture since 1840.

== History ==
The existence of a fortification at the site of Mehun-sur-Yèvre dates from antiquity. The major remains are of the early 13th century and the later 14th century. The present standing ruins date from a castle founded under the Courtenays after 1209. This fortress was transformed into a princely residence by John, Duke of Berry in 1367. Largely ruined in the 18th century the castle represented an excellent example of late Gothic architecture and early Renaissance architecture. Charles VII of France, died in the castle on July 22, 1461.

== Description of the castle ==
The castle is built on a trapezoid plan, and originally had a tall cylindrical tower at each corner and a rectangular tower in the middle of one of the long sides. An entrance was formed in the wall between two of the towers. One tower (12m diameter) was much larger than the others (8m) and served as the keep. The keep and the west tower still stand to their full height, each capped with intricate defensive machicolations. Manuscript illustrations indicate that the castle also had a large chapel above the principal entrance.

== Gallery ==
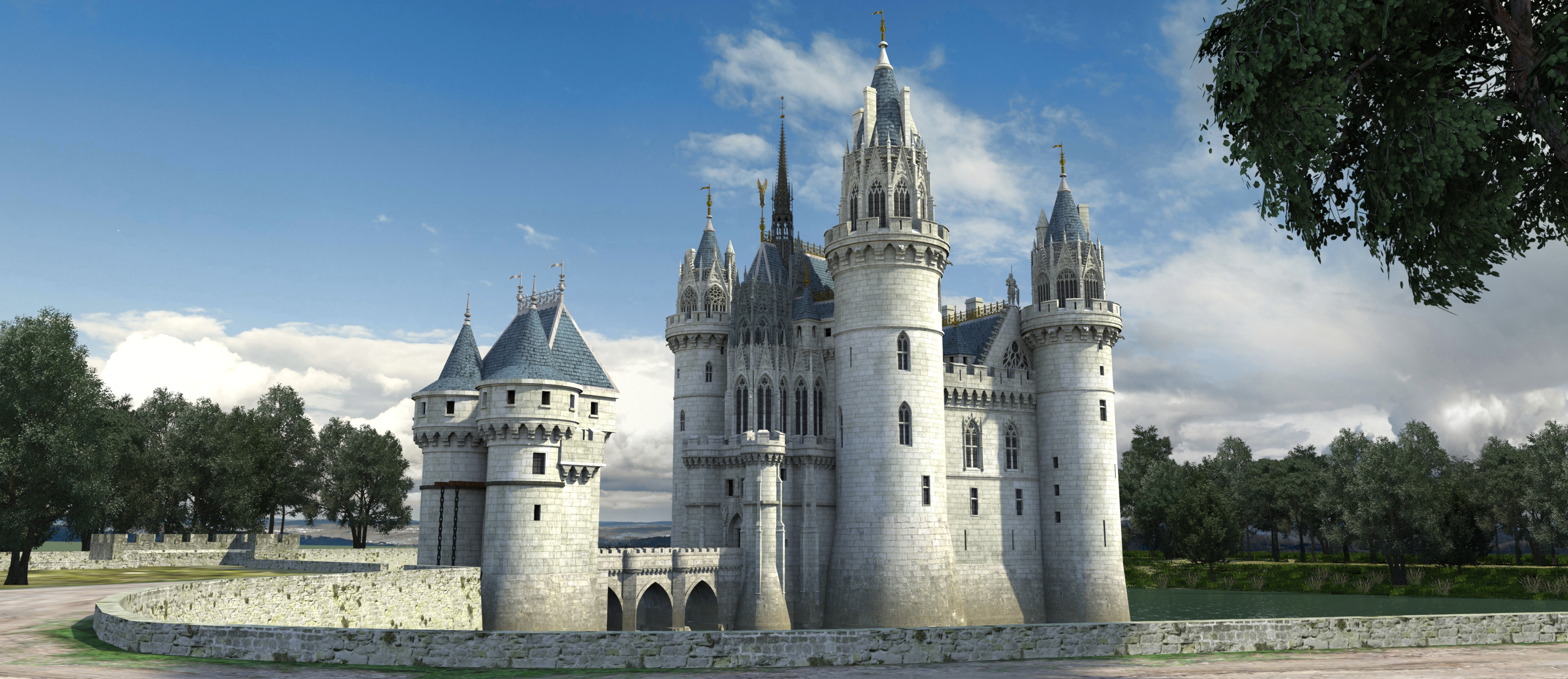
Reconstruction of the castle in its heyday

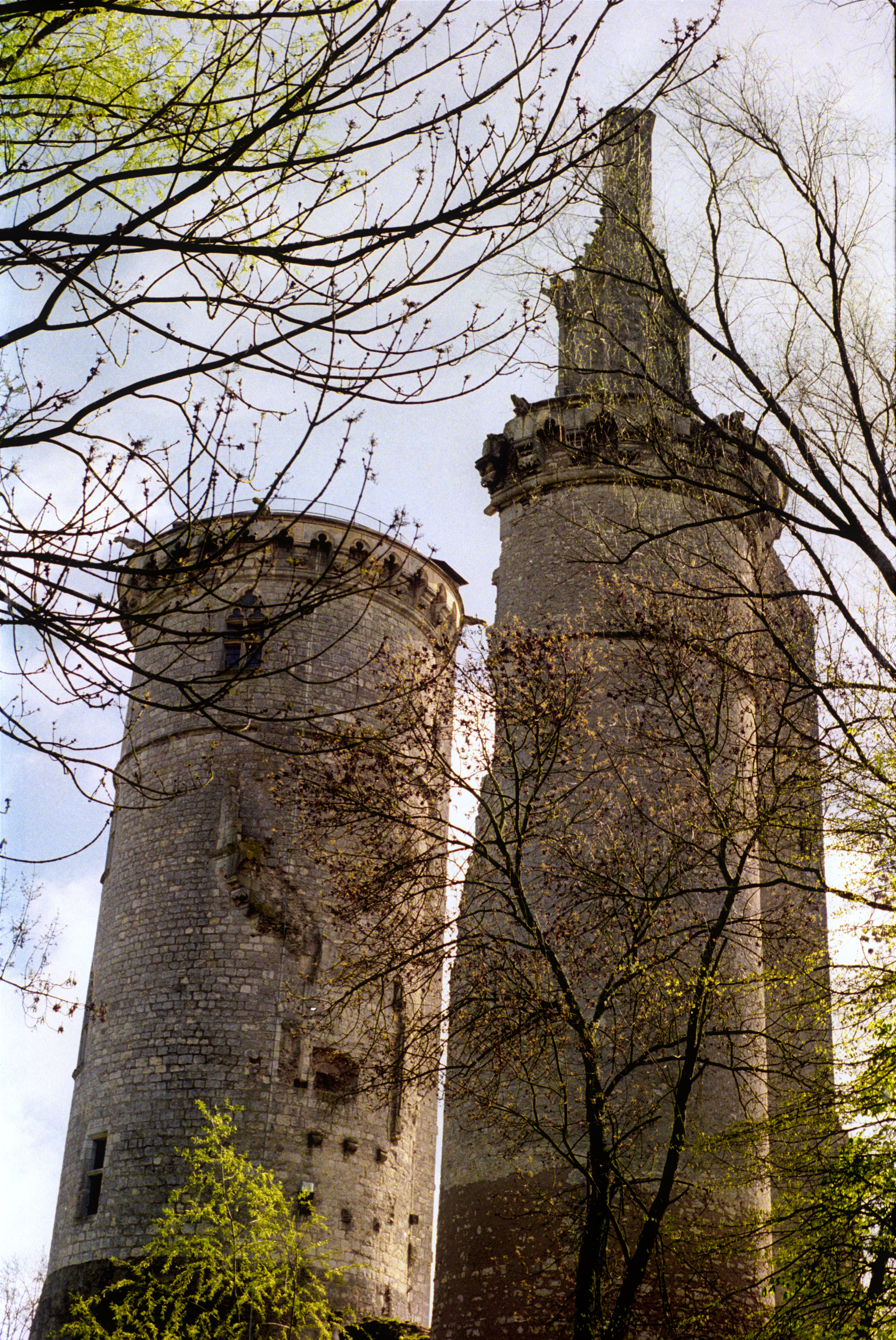
The castle today

== See also ==
- List of castles in France
