= Bonne of Luxembourg =

French noblewoman (1315–1349)

- Duchess of Normandy
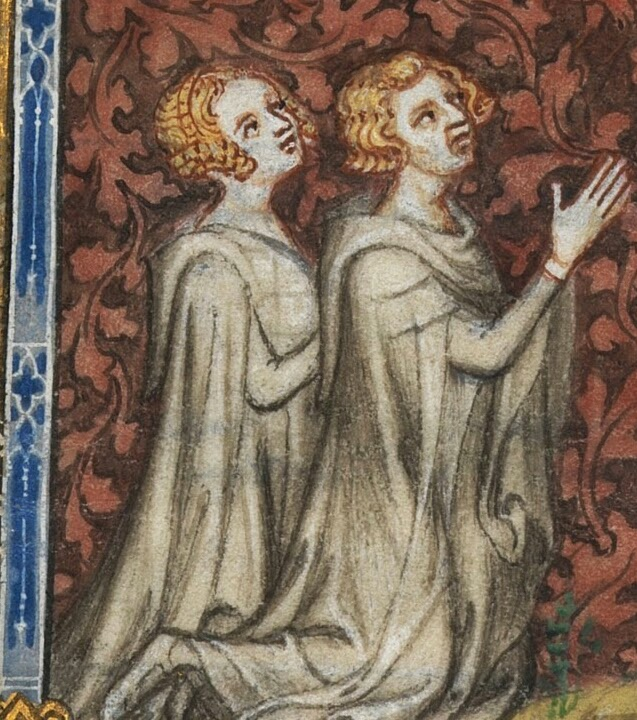
- Bonne with her husband
- Born: 20 May 1315; Prague, Bohemia
- Died: 11 September 1349 (aged 34); Maubuisson, France
- Burial: Maubuisson Abbey, France
- Spouse: John, Duke of Normandy (later John II) (m. 1332)
- Issue: Charles V, King of France; Louis I, Duke of Anjou; John, Duke of Berry; Philip II, Duke of Burgundy; Joan, Queen of Navarre; Marie, Duchess of Bar; Isabella, Countess of Vertus
- House: Luxembourg
- Father: John, King of Bohemia
- Mother: Elizabeth of Bohemia

Bonne of Luxemburg or Jutta of Luxemburg (20 May 1315 – 11 September 1349), was born Jutta (Judith), the second daughter of King John of Bohemia, and his first wife, Elisabeth of Bohemia. She was the first wife of King John II of France; however, as she died a year prior to his accession, she was never a French queen. Jutta was referred to in French historiography as Bonne de Luxembourg, since she was a member of the House of Luxembourg. Among her children were Charles V of France, Philip II, Duke of Burgundy, and Joan, Queen of Navarre.

== Biography ==
In June or July 1315, Jutta was betrothed to the future King Casimir the Great of Poland, but he married Aldona of Lithuania in 1325 instead.

In 1326, Jutta was next betrothed to Henry of Bar. This arrangement was broken, however, and she stayed at the abbey of Saint-Esprit until her marriage to John, Duke of Normandy, the future King John II of France.

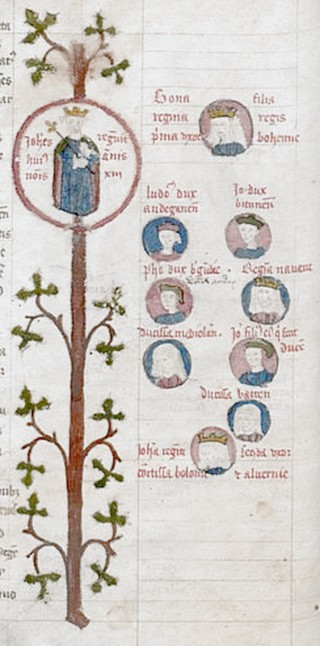
The family of King John.

Jutta was married to John, Duke of Normandy, on 28 July 1332 at the Collegiate Church of Notre-Dame, Melun. She was 17 years old, and the future king was 13. Her name Jutta (or Guta), translatable into English as Good (in the feminine case), was changed by the time of her marriage to Bonne (French) or Bona (Latin). Upon marriage, Bonne was the wife of the heir to the French throne, becoming Duchess of Normandy and Countess of Anjou and Maine. The wedding was celebrated in the presence of six thousand guests. The festivities were prolonged by a further two months when the young groom was finally knighted at the cathedral of Notre-Dame in Paris. John was solemnly granted the arms of a knight in front of a prestigious audience bringing together the kings of Bohemia and Navarre, and the dukes of Burgundy, Lorraine and the Brabant.

Bonne was a patron of the arts, the composer Guillaume de Machaut being one of her favorites.

She died on 11 September 1349 of the bubonic plague in Maubuisson, France at the age of thirty-four. She was buried in the Abbey of Maubuisson.

Less than six months after Bonne's death, John married Joan I, Countess of Auvergne.

=== Issue ===
John and Bonne had the following children together:

- Charles V of France (21 January 1338 – 16 September 1380)
- Catherine (1338–1338) died young
- Louis I, Duke of Anjou (23 July 1339 – 20 September 1384)
- John, Duke of Berry (30 November 1340 – 15 June 1416)
- Philip II, Duke of Burgundy (17 January 1342 – 27 April 1404)
- Joan (24 June 1343 – 3 November 1373), married Charles II of Navarre in 1352
- Marie (12 September 1344 – October 1404), married Robert, Duke of Bar in 1364
- Agnes (1345–1349), died young
- Margaret (1347–1352), died young
- Isabelle (1 October 1348 – 11 September 1372), married Gian Galeazzo Visconti in 1360

== Sources ==
- d'Arras, Jean (2012) [First publ. 1394]. Melusine; or The Noble History of Lusignan. Translated by Maddox, Donald; Sturm-Maddox, Sara. Penn State University Press. OCLC 782252390.
- Boehm, Barbara Drake; Fajt, Jiri, eds. (2005). Prague: The Crown of Bohemia, 1347-1437 (PDF). Yale University Press.
- Hand, Joni M. (2013). Women, Manuscripts and Identity in Northern Europe, 1350-1550. Ashgate Publishing. OCLC 1067212145.
- Nicolle, David (2004). Poitiers 1356: The Capture of a King. Osprey Publishing. ISBN 9781841765167.
- Perrot, Georges; Reinach, Salomon, eds. (1907). "Revue archéologique". Revue Archéologique Ou Recueil de Documents et de Mémoires Relatifs À l'Étude des Monuments et À la Philologie de l'Antiquité et du Moyen Age (in French). 4-Vol. 9 (Juillet-Decembre 1907). Ernest Leroux. ISSN 0035-0737.
- Robertson, Anne Walters (2002). Guillaume de Machaut and Reims. Cambridge University Press. OCLC 472826512.
- Vaughan, Richard (2005) [First publ. 1962]. Philip the Bold: The Formation of the Burgundian State. Boydell & Brewer. OCLC 645377248.
