= Charles V of France =

King of France from 1364 to 1380

Charles V
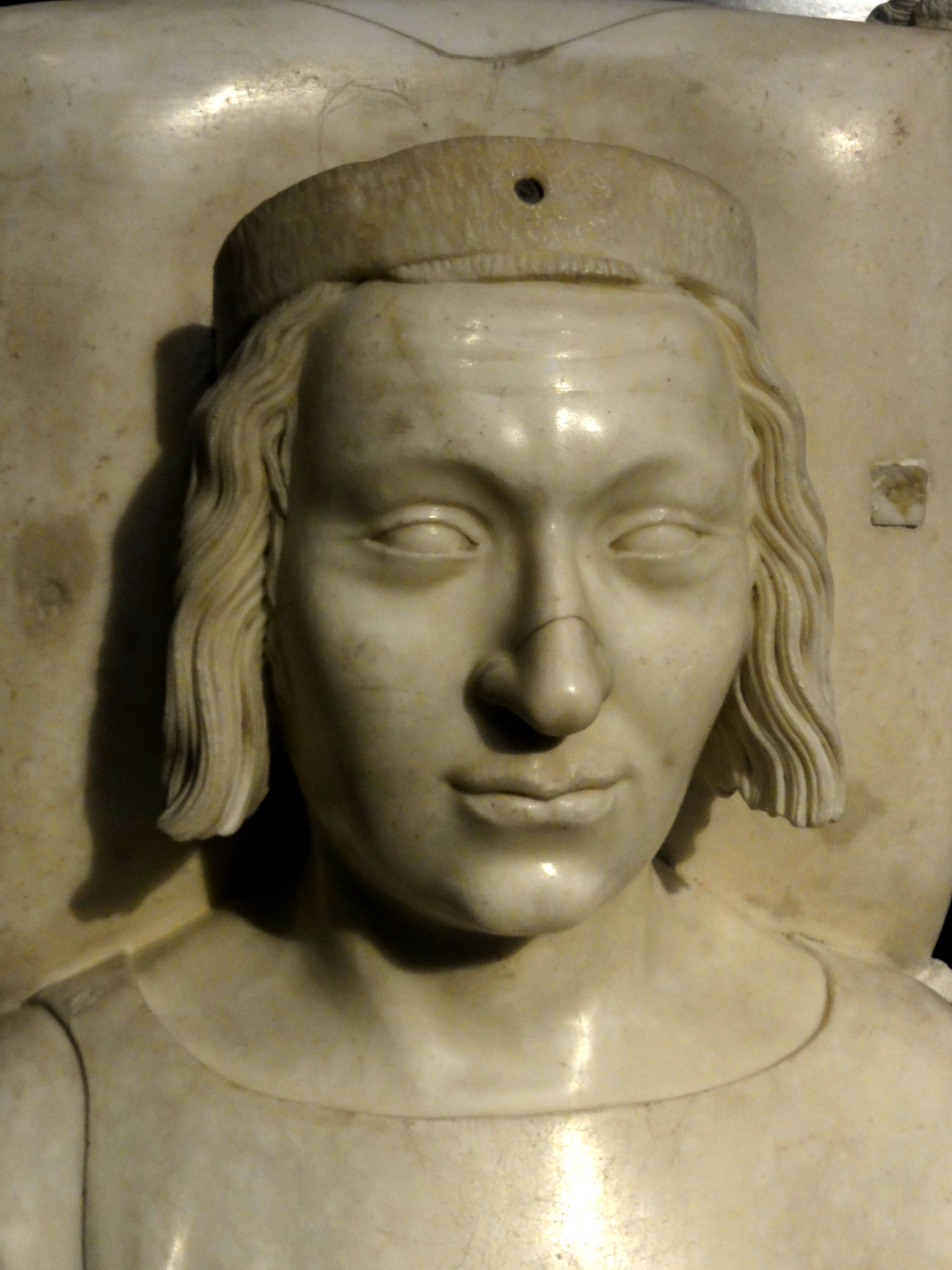
- Contemporary gisant of Charles aged 27

King of France
- Reign: 8 April 1364 – 16 September 1380
- Coronation: 19 May 1364
- Predecessor: John II
- Successor: Charles VI

Regent of France
- Regency: 1356–1360
- Monarch: John II
- Born: 21 January 1338; Vincennes, France
- Died: 16 September 1380 (aged 42); Beauté-sur-Marne, France
- Burial: 26 September 1380; Saint Denis Basilica
- Spouse: Joanna of Bourbon (m. 1350; died 1378)
- Issue more...: Charles VI, King of France; Louis I, Duke of Orléans; Catherine, Countess of Montpensier
- House: Valois
- Father: John II of France
- Mother: Bonne of Bohemia

Charles V (Note: He was actually the seventh king of that name to rule France, following Charlemagne (Charles the Great), Charles the Younger, Charles the Bald, Charles the Fat, Charles the Simple and Charles the Fair. However, he officially ruled as "Charles V", being the first one to assume a regnal number.) (21 January 1338 – 16 September 1380), called the Wise (French: le Sage; Latin: Sapiens), was King of France from 1364 to his death in 1380. His reign marked an early high point for France during the Hundred Years' War as his armies recovered much of the territory held by the English and successfully reversed the military losses of his predecessors.

Charles became regent of France when his father John II was captured by the English at the Battle of Poitiers in 1356. To pay for the defense of the kingdom, Charles raised taxes. As a result, he faced hostility from the nobility, led by Charles the Bad, King of Navarre; the opposition of the French bourgeoisie, which was channeled through the Estates-General led by Étienne Marcel; and with a peasant revolt known as the Jacquerie. Charles overcame all of these rebellions, but in order to liberate his father, he had to conclude the Treaty of Brétigny in 1360, in which he abandoned large portions of south-western France to King Edward III of England and agreed to pay a huge ransom.

Charles became king in 1364. With the help of talented advisers, his skillful management of the kingdom allowed him to replenish the royal treasury and to restore the prestige of the House of Valois. He established the first permanent army paid with regular wages, which liberated the French populace from the companies of routiers who regularly plundered the country when not employed. Led by Bertrand du Guesclin, the French Army was able to turn the tide of the Hundred Years' War to Charles' advantage, and by the end of Charles' reign, they had reconquered almost all the territories ceded to the English in 1360. Furthermore, the French fleet, led by Admiral Jean de Vienne, managed to attack the English coast for the first time since the beginning of the Hundred Years' War.

Charles V died in 1380. He was succeeded by his son Charles VI, whose disastrous reign allowed the English to regain control of large parts of France.

== Biography ==
=== Early life ===
Charles was born at the Château de Vincennes outside of Paris, the son of Prince John and Princess Bonne of France. He was educated at court with other boys of his age to whom he would remain close throughout his life: his uncle Philip, Duke of Orléans (only two years older than himself), his three brothers Louis, John, and Philip, Louis of Bourbon, Edward and Robert of Bar, Godfrey of Brabant, Louis I, Count of Étampes, Louis of Évreux, brother of Charles the Bad, John and Charles of Artois, Charles of Alençon, and Philip of Rouvres.

The future king was highly intelligent but physically weak, with pale skin and a thin, ill-proportioned body. This made a sharp contrast to his father, who was tall, strong and sandy-haired.

=== First Dauphin from the House of Valois ===
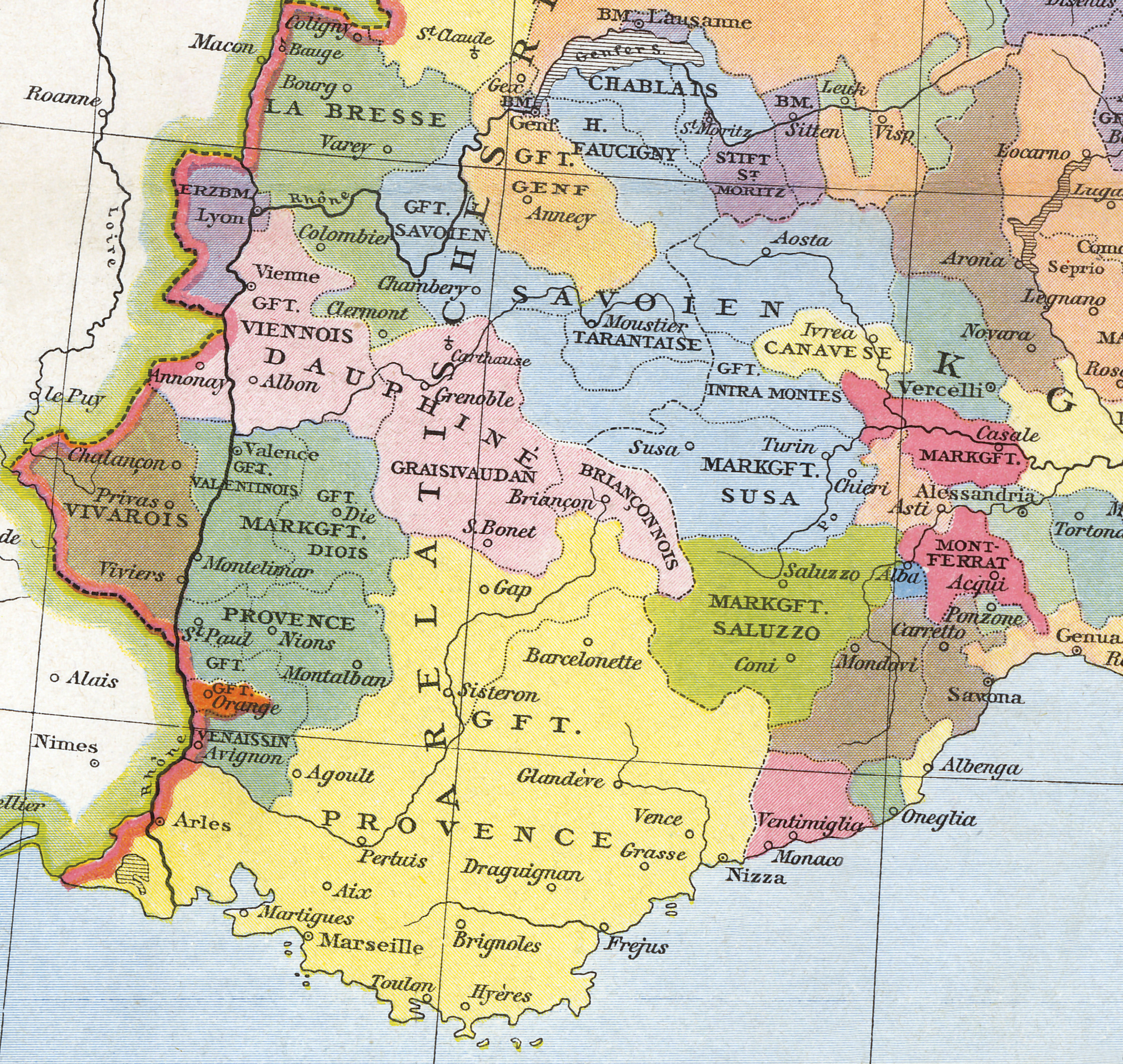
Dauphiné of Viennois (pink), within the Kingdom of Burgundy (Arles), under the suzerainty of the Holy Roman Empire

In 1343, Humbert II, Dauphin of Viennois (d. 1355), pressured by various financial difficulties, and being left childless after the death of his only son, decided to sell the Dauphiné, a vast feudal polity within the Kingdom of Burgundy (Arles), then under the suzerainty of the Holy Roman Empire. Neither the pope nor the emperor wanted to buy, and thus a series of complex negotiations were initiated between Humbert and Charles' grandfather, the reigning French king Philip VI. It was initially agreed that Humbert's domains will pass to Charles' paternal uncle Philip, Duke of Orléans, but already in 1344, those provisions were changed, and a new agreement was made, designating Charles' father John as Humbert's heir in the Dauphiné.

By 1349, Humbert decided to finalize the sale and relinquish his rule over Dauphiné in favor of the House of Valois, and thus the final agreement was made. Under the Treaty of Romans, the Dauphiné of Viennois was to be held by a son of the future king John the Good. So it was Charles, the eldest son of the latter, who became the first Dauphin of Viennois from the House of Valois. At the age of twelve, he was vested power in the summer of 1349 (16 July), and proceeded to Grenoble (10 December 1349 to March 1350). A few days after his arrival, the people of Grenoble were invited to the Place Notre-Dame, where a platform was erected. Young Charles took his place next to Bishop John of Chissé and received the oath of allegiance of the people. In exchange, he publicly promised to respect the community charter and confirmed the liberties and franchises of former dauphin Humbert II, which were summed up in a solemn statute before he signed his abdication and granted a last amnesty to all prisoners, except those facing the penalty of death.

On 8 April 1350 at Tain-l'Hermitage, the young Dauphin married his cousin Joanna of Bourbon at the age of 12. The prior approval of the pope was obtained for this consanguineous marriage (both were descended from Charles of Valois). The marriage was delayed by the death of his mother Bonne of Luxembourg and his grandmother Joan the Lame, swept away by the plague (he no longer saw them after he left for the Dauphiné). The young dauphin himself had been seriously ill from August to December 1349. Gatherings were limited to slow the spread of the plague then raging in Europe, so the marriage took place in private.

The control of Dauphiné was valuable to the House of Valois, because it was an important, strategically positioned domain within the Holy Roman Empire, thus allowing the French to extend their influence beyond the Rhône Valley, a major trade route between the Mediterranean and northern Europe since ancient times, putting them in direct contact with Avignon, a papal territory and diplomatic center of medieval Europe. Despite his young age, the dauphin applied to be recognized by his subjects, interceding to stop a war raging between two vassal families, and gaining experience that was very useful to him.

=== Mission in Normandy ===
Charles was recalled to Paris at the death of his grandfather Philip VI (22 August 1350) and participated in the coronation of his father John II the Good on 26 September 1350 in Reims. With his father ascending to the French throne, young Charles became the heir presumptive and thus for the first time both honors, the Dauphin de Viennois and heir to the French throne, were held by the same person. The legitimacy of king John II, and that of the Valois in general, was not unanimous. His father, Philip VI, had lost all credibility with the disasters of Crécy, Calais, the ravages of the plague, and the monetary changes needed to support the royal finances. The royal clan had to cope with opposition from all sides in the kingdom.

The first of these was led by King Charles II of Navarre, called "the Bad", whose mother Queen Joan II of Navarre had renounced the crown of France for that of Navarre in 1328. Charles II of Navarre was the eldest of a powerful lineage. Ambitious of attaining the crown of France, he managed to gather around him the malcontents. He was supported by his relatives and allies: the House of Boulogne (and their kin in Auvergne), the barons of Champagne loyal to Joan II of Navarre (heir of Champagne, had it not merged into the crown of France), and by the followers of Robert III of Artois, driven from the kingdom by Philip VI. He also had the support of the University of Paris and the northwestern merchants where the cross-Channel trade was vital.

A brilliant orator, and accustomed to a monarchy controlled by the Cortes of Navarre (the equivalent of the States General), Charles the Bad championed the reform of a state considered too arbitrary, leaving no voice to the nobility or the cities (John the Good governed with a circle of favorites and officers sometimes of humble extraction). Unlike his father, Charles V thought that a king must have the approval of his subjects and must listen to their advice. This view allowed him to approach the Norman nobles and the reformists, and thus Charles of Navarre.

The power of Navarre was such that, on 8 January 1354, he murdered with impunity his rival Constable Charles de la Cerda (the king's favourite), and openly avowed this crime. He even obtained, through the Treaty of Mantes, territorial concessions and sovereignty by threatening to make an alliance with the English. But in Avignon, the English and French were negotiating a peace that would prevent Charles II of Navarre from counting on the support of Edward III. He therefore concluded a treaty with the English in which the Kingdom of France would be partitioned between them. An English landing was planned for the end of the truce, which would expire on 24 June 1355.

King John II ordered the Dauphin in March 1355 to organize the defense of Normandy, which required raising the necessary taxes. The task was difficult because of the growing influence of Charles the Bad, who had acquired a status similar to that of a "Duke" under the Treaty of Mantes. He was likely to ally with Edward III and could at any time open the gateway to Normandy to the English. The Dauphin avoided war by reconciling Navarre with the king, which was sealed with a ceremony at the court on 24 September 1355. Edward III was offended at the latest betrayal of Charles of Navarre, and the promised landing did not occur.

=== Regency and the uprising of the Third Estate ===
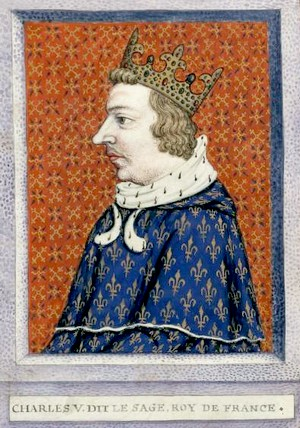
Miniature, not contemporary

King John was considered by many as a rash ruler, much in the same style as the feudal kings who came before which by then was becoming outdated, who alienated his nobles through arbitrary justice and elevated associates that were sometimes considered questionable. After a three-year break, the Hundred Years' War with England resumed in 1355, with Edward, The Black Prince, leading an English-Gascon army in a violent raid across southwestern France. After checking an English incursion into Normandy, John led an army of about 16,000 men to the south, crossing the Loire river in September 1356 with the goal of outflanking the Prince's 8,000 soldiers at Poitiers. Rejecting advice from one captain to surround and starve the Prince, a tactic Edward feared, John attacked the strong enemy position. In the subsequent Battle of Poitiers (19 September 1356), English archery all but annihilated the French cavalry, and John was captured with Charles' 14-year-old brother Philip. Charles led a battalion at Poitiers that withdrew early in the struggle; whether the order came from John (as he later claimed), or whether Charles himself ordered the withdrawal, is unclear.

The outcome of the battle left many embittered with the nobility. Popular opinion accused the nobles of betraying the king, while Charles and his brothers escaped blame – he was received with honor upon his return to Paris. The Dauphin summoned the Estates-General in October to seek money for the defense of the country. Furious at what they saw as poor management, many of those assembled organized into a body led by Étienne Marcel, the Provost of Merchants (a title roughly equivalent to Mayor of Paris today). Marcel demanded the dismissal of seven royal ministers, their replacement by a Council of 28 made up of nobles, clergy and bourgeois, and the release of Charles the Bad, who had been imprisoned by John for the murder of his Constable Charles de la Cerda. The Dauphin refused the demands, dismissed the Estates-General, and left Paris.

A contest of wills ensued. In an attempt to raise money, Charles tried to devalue the currency; Marcel ordered strikes, and the Dauphin was forced to cancel his plans and recall the Estates in February 1357. The Third Estate presented the Dauphin with a Grand Ordinance, a list of 61 articles that would have given the Estates-General the right to approve all future taxes, assemble at their own volition, and elect a Council of 36 (with 12 members from each Estate) to advise the king. Charles eventually signed the ordinance, but his dismissed councillors took news of the document to King John, imprisoned in Bordeaux. The King renounced the ordinance before being taken to England by Prince Edward.

Charles made a royal progress through the country that summer, winning support from the provinces, and winning Paris back. Marcel, meanwhile, enlisted Charles the Bad, who asserted that his claim to the throne of France was at least as good as that of King Edward III of England, who had used his claim as the pretext for initiating the Hundred Years' War.

Marcel used the murder of a citizen seeking sanctuary in Paris to make an attack close to the Dauphin. Summoning a group of tradesmen, the Provost marched at the head of an army of 3,000, entered the royal palace, and had the crowd murder two of the Dauphin's marshals before his eyes. Charles, horrified, momentarily pacified the crowd, but sent his family away and left the capital as quickly as he could. Marcel's action destroyed support for the Third Estate among the nobles, and the Provost's subsequent backing of the Jacquerie undermined his support from the towns. He was murdered by a mob on 31 July 1358. Charles was able to recover Paris the following month and later issued a general amnesty for all, except close associates of Marcel.

=== Treaty of Brétigny ===
John's capture gave the English the edge in peace negotiations following the Battle of Poitiers. The King signed the Treaty of London in 1359 that ceded most of western France to England and imposed a ruinous ransom of 4 million écus on the country. The Dauphin (backed by his councillors and the Estates General) rejected the treaty, and English King Edward invaded France later that year. Edward reached Reims in December and Paris in March, but Charles forbade his soldiers from direct confrontation with the English, relying on improved municipal fortifications made to Paris by Marcel. He would later rebuild the wall on the Left Bank (Rive gauche), and he built a new wall on the Right Bank (Rive droite) that extended to a new fortification called the Bastille. Edward pillaged and raided the countryside but could not bring the French to a decisive battle, so he eventually agreed to reduce his terms. This non-confrontational strategy would prove extremely beneficial to France during Charles' reign.

The Treaty of Brétigny, signed on 8 May 1360, ceded a third of western France (mostly in Aquitaine and Gascony) to the English and lowered the King's ransom to 3 million écus. King John was released the following October. His second son, Louis of Anjou, took his place as a hostage.

Though his father had regained his freedom, Charles suffered a great personal tragedy at nearly the same time. His three-year-old daughter Joan and infant daughter Bonne died within two months of each other late in 1360; at their double funeral, the Dauphin was said to be "so sorrowful as never before he had been." Charles himself had been severely ill, with his hair and nails falling out; some suggest the symptoms are those of arsenic poisoning.

John proved as ineffective at ruling upon his return to France as he had before his capture. When Louis of Anjou escaped from English custody, John announced he had no choice but to return to captivity himself. He arrived in London in January 1364, became ill, and died in April.

== King of France ==
=== Accession and first acts ===
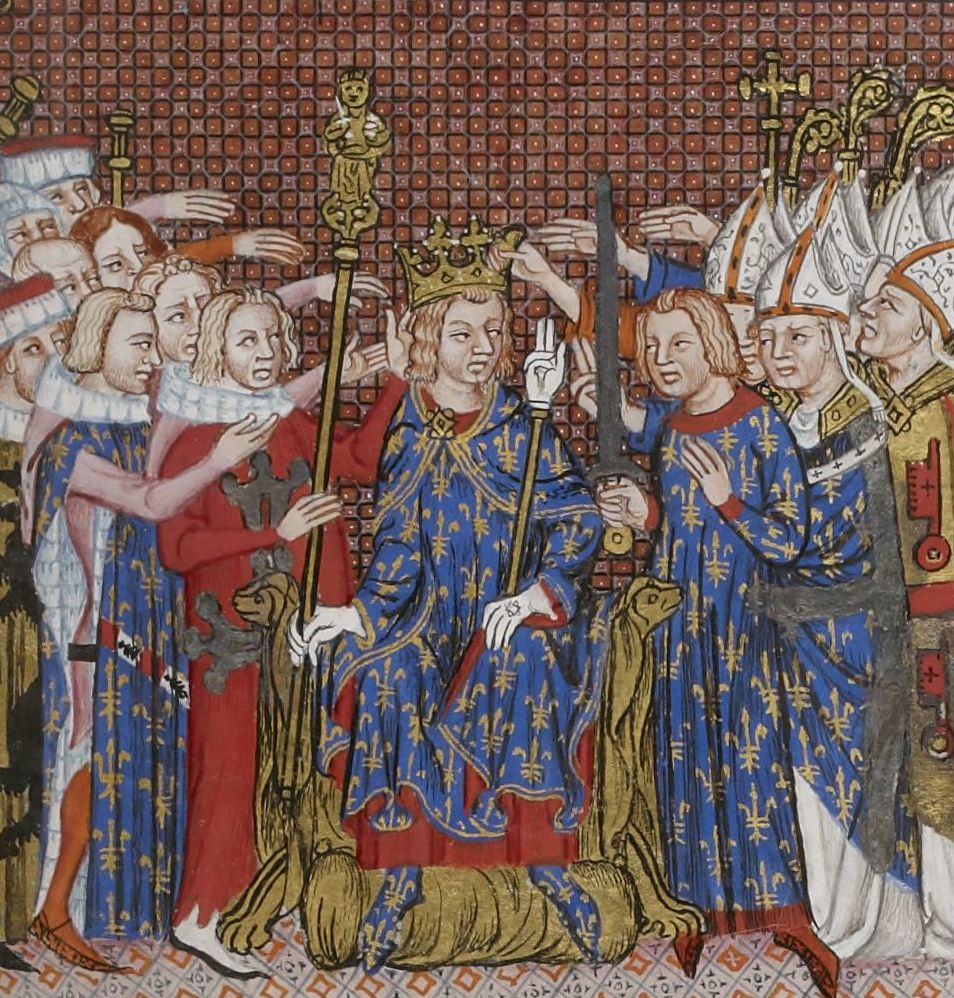
Coronation of Charles V

Charles was crowned King of France in 1364 at the Cathedral of Reims. The new king was highly intelligent, but closed-mouthed and secretive, with sharp eyes, a long nose and a pale, grave manner. He suffered from gout in the right hand and an abscess in his left arm, possibly a side-effect of an attempted poisoning in 1359. Doctors were able to treat the wound but told him that if it ever dried up, he would die within 15 days. His manner may have concealed a more emotional side; his marriage to Joanna of Bourbon was considered very strong, and he made no attempt to hide his grief at her funeral or those of his children, five of whom predeceased him.

His reign was dominated by the war with the English and two major problems: recovering the territories ceded at Brétigny and ridding the land of the Tard-Venus (French for "latecomers"), mercenary companies that turned to robbery and pillage after the treaty was signed. In achieving these aims, Charles turned to a minor noble from Brittany named Bertrand du Guesclin. Nicknamed "the Black Dog of Brocéliande", du Guesclin fought the English during the Breton War of Succession and was an expert in guerrilla warfare. Du Guesclin also defeated Charles II of Navarre at the Battle of Cocherel in 1364 and eliminated his threat to Paris.

In order to lure the Tard-Venus out of France, Charles first hired them for an attempted crusade into Hungary, but their reputation for brigandage preceded them, and the citizens of Strasbourg refused to let them cross the Rhine on their journey. Charles next sent the mercenary companies (under the leadership of du Guesclin) to fight in a civil war in Castile between King Peter the Cruel and his illegitimate half-brother Henry. Peter had English backing, while Henry was supported by the French.

Du Guesclin and his men were able to drive Peter out of Castile in 1365 after the capture of the fortresses of Magallón and Briviesca and the capital Burgos. The Black Prince, now serving as his father's viceroy in southwestern France, took up Peter's cause. At the Battle of Nájera in April 1367, the English defeated Henry's army, and Peter went back to the Castilian throne. Du Guesclin was captured after a memorable resistance and ransomed by Charles V, who considered him invaluable. The Black Prince, affected by dysentery, soon withdrew his support from Peter. The English army suffered badly during the retreat. Four English soldiers out of five died during the Castilian campaign. In 1369, du Guesclin renewed the attack against Peter, defeating him at the decisive Battle of Montiel. Henry stabbed the captive Peter to death in du Guesclin's tent, thereby gaining the throne of Castile. Bertrand was made Duke of Molina, and the Franco-Castilian alliance was sealed. Charles V could now resume the war against England under favorable conditions.

=== War resumes ===
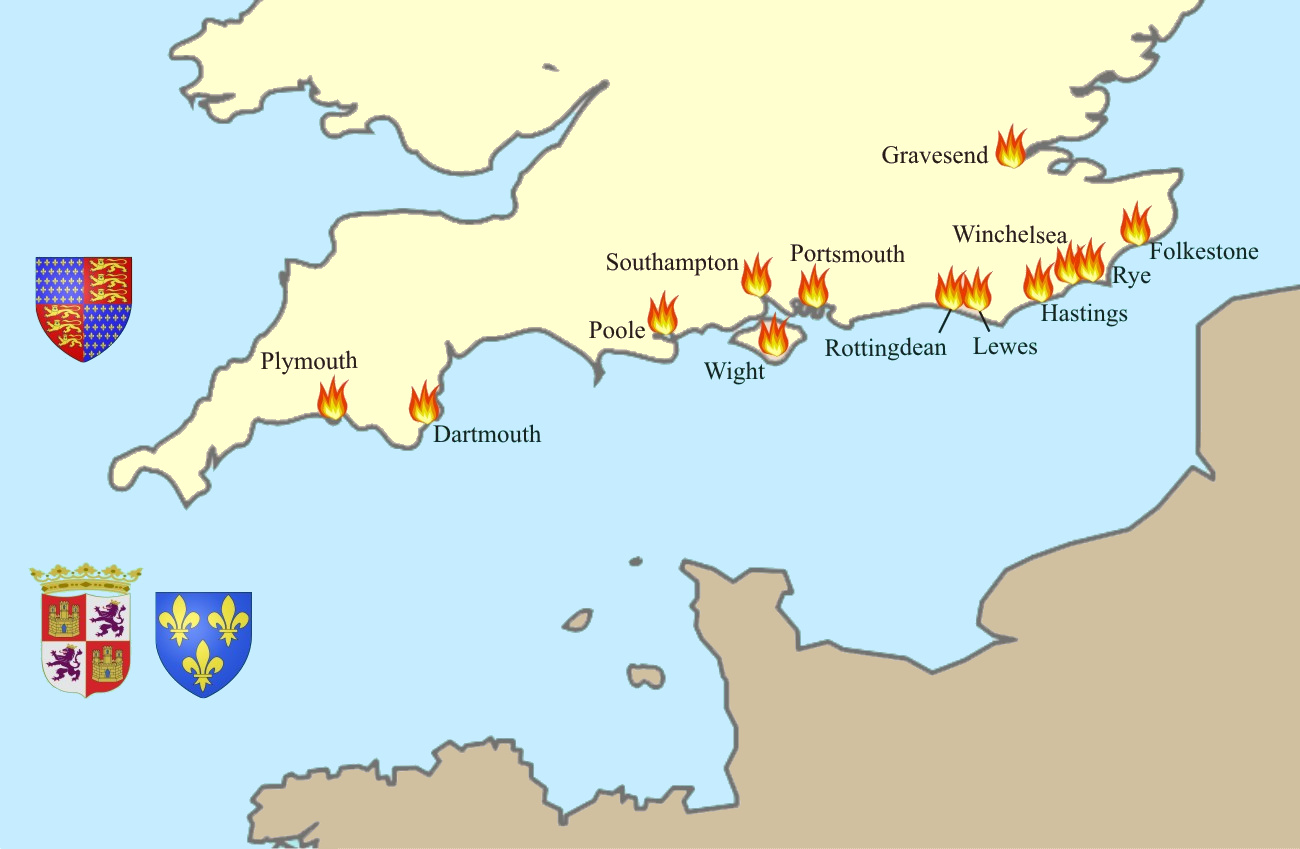
Franco-Castilian raids on England

After the Castilian campaign, the Black Prince was invalid and heavily in debt. His rule in Gascony became increasingly autocratic. Nobles from Gascony petitioned Charles for aid, and when the Black Prince refused to answer a summons to Paris to answer the charges, Charles judged him disloyal and declared war in May 1369.

Instead of seeking a major battle, as his predecessors had done, Charles chose a strategy of attrition, spreading the fighting at every point possible. The French and Castilian navies destroyed an English fleet at La Rochelle in 1372. Then, du Guesclin launched destructive raids against the coasts of England, naval reprisals to the English chevauchées. Bertrand du Guesclin, appointed Constable of France in 1370, beat back a major English offensive in northern France with an unnerving combination of raids, sieges, and pitched battles. He notably crushed Robert Knolles at the Battle of Pontvallain.

Most of the major English leaders were killed in a few months, and the Black Prince fled to England, where he died in 1376. By 1375, Charles recovered much of the English territories in France except Calais and Gascony, effectively nullifying the Treaty of Brétigny.

=== Papal schism ===
In 1376, Pope Gregory XI, fearing a loss of the Papal States, decided to move his court back to Rome after nearly 70 years in Avignon. Charles, hoping to maintain French influence over the papacy, tried to persuade Pope Gregory to remain in France, arguing that "Rome is wherever the Pope happens to be." Gregory refused.

The Pope died in March 1378. When cardinals gathered to elect a successor, a Roman mob, concerned that the predominantly French College of Cardinals would elect a French pope who would bring the papacy back to Avignon, surrounded the Vatican and demanded the election of a Roman. On 9 April, the cardinals elected Bartolomeo Prigamo, Archbishop of Bari, and a commoner by birth, as Pope Urban VI. The new pope quickly alienated his cardinals by criticising their vices, limiting the areas where they could receive income and even rising to strike one cardinal before a second restrained him. The French cardinals left Rome that summer and declared Urban's election invalid because of mob intimidation (a reason that had not been cited at the time of the election) and elected Cardinal Robert of Geneva as Pope Clement VII that September.

The French cardinals quickly moved to get Charles' support. The theology faculty of the University of Paris advised Charles not to make a hasty decision, but he recognised Clement as Pope in November and forbade any obedience to Urban. Charles' support allowed Clement to survive as pope and led to the Papal Schism, which would divide Europe for nearly 40 years.

=== Death ===
Charles' last years were spent in the consolidation of Normandy (and the neutralisation of Charles of Navarre). Peace negotiations with the English continued unsuccessfully. The taxes he had levied to support his wars against the English caused deep disaffection among the working classes.

The abscess on the King's left arm dried up in early September 1380, and Charles prepared to die. On his deathbed, perhaps fearful for his soul, Charles announced the abolition of the hearth tax, the foundation of the government's finances. The ordinance would have been impossible to carry out, but its terms were known, and the government's refusal to reduce any of the other taxes on the people sparked the Maillotin revolt in 1381.

The King died on 16 September 1380 and was succeeded by his 11-year-old son, Charles VI. He is buried in the Basilica of Saint-Denis, about five miles north of Paris.

== Legacy ==
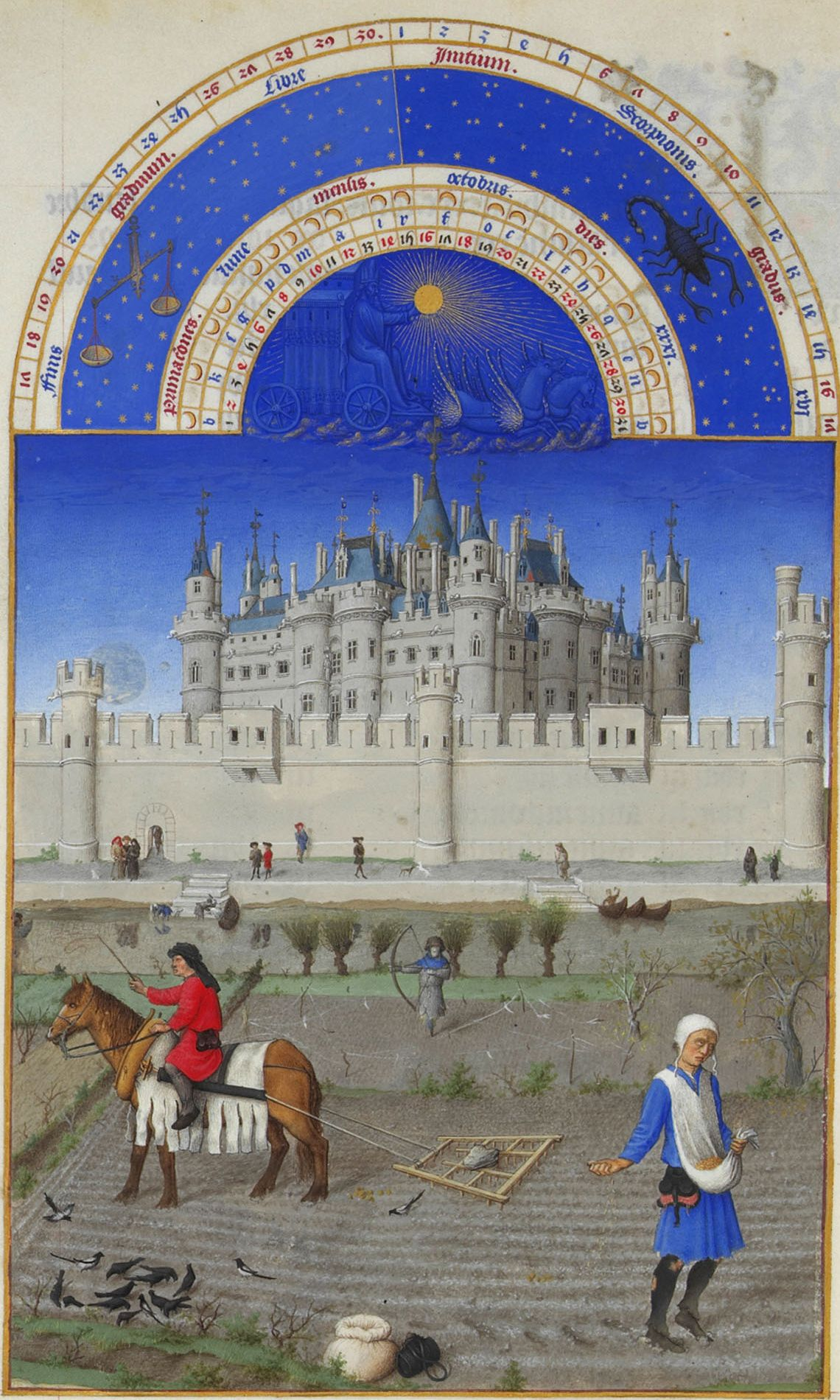
The Louvre Palace, shown in this early fifteenth century illumination, representing the month of October in Les très riches Heures du duc de Berry, was rebuilt during the reign of Charles V – inaugurating a new era of royal architecture.

Charles' reputation was of great significance for posterity, especially as his conception of governance was one that courtiers wished his successors could follow. Christine de Pizan's biography, commissioned by Philip the Bold, Duke of Burgundy, in 1404, is a source of most of the intimate details of the king's life of which we are aware, but also provides a moral example for his successors. It draws heavily on the work of Nicole Oresme (who translated Aristotle's moral works into French) and Giles of Rome. Philippe de Mézières, in his allegorical "Songe du Vieil Pèlerin", attempts to persuade the dauphin (later King Charles VI) to follow the example of his wise father, notably in piety, though also to pursue reforming zeal in all policy considerations.

Of great importance to Charles V's cultural program was his vast library, housed in his expanded Louvre Palace and described in great detail by the nineteenth-century French historian Leopold Delisle. Containing over 1,200 volumes, it was symbolic of the authority and magnificence of the royal person, but also of his concern with government for the common good. Charles was keen to collect copies of works in French, in order that his counsellors had access to them. Perhaps the most significant ones commissioned for the library were those of Nicole Oresme, who translated Aristotle's Politics, Ethics, and Economics into eloquent French for the first time (an earlier attempt had been made at the Politics, but the manuscript is now lost). If the Politics and Economics served as a manual for government, then the Ethics advised the king on how to be a good man.

Other important works commissioned for the royal library were the anonymous legal treatise "Songe du Vergier", greatly inspired by the debates of Philip IV's jurists with Pope Boniface VIII, the translations of Raoul de Presles, which included St. Augustine's City of God, and the Grandes Chroniques de France edited in 1377 to emphasise the vassalage of Edward III.

Charles' kingship placed great emphasis on both royal ceremony and scientific political theory, and to contemporaries and posterity his lifestyle at once embodied the reflective life advised by Aristotle and the model of French kingship derived from St. Louis, Charlemagne, and Clovis which he had illustrated in his Coronation Book of 1364, now in the British Library.

Charles V was also a builder king, and he created or rebuilt several significant buildings in the late 14th century style including the Bastille, the Louvre Palace, Château de Vincennes, and Château de Saint-Germain-en-Laye, which were widely copied by the nobility of the day.

His successes, however, proved ephemeral. Charles' brothers, who dominated the regency council that ruled in the king's name until 1388, quarrelled among themselves and divided the government. Charles VI, meanwhile, preferred tournaments to the duties of kingship, and his descent into madness in 1392 put his uncles back in power. By 1419, the country was divided between Armagnac and Burgundian factions and Henry V was conquering the northern part of France. The hard-won victories of Charles V had been lost through the venality of his successors.

== Marriage and issue ==
On 8 April 1350 Charles married Joanna of Bourbon (3 February 1338 – 4 February 1378), leaving:

1. Joanna (end September 1357 (Note: News of "l’accouchement madame la duchesse de Normandie" was brought to her husband 30 September 1357.) – 21 October 1360, Saint Antoine-des-Champs Abbey, Paris (Note: An epitaph at Saint-Antoine-des-Champs records the death at the Abbey on 21 October 1360 of "madame Jehanne aisnée fille de Monsieur Charles, aisné filz du roy de France régent le Royaume...")), interred at Saint-Antoine-des-Champs Abbey.
2. Bonne (1358 – 7 November 1360, Palais Royal, Paris (Note: An epitaph at Saint-Antoine-des-Champs records the death "au palais" on 7 November 1360 of "madame Bonne seconde fille de Monsieur Charles, aisné filz du roy de France régent le Royaume...".)), interred beside her older sister. (Note: The Chronique des règnes de Jean II et de Charles V records the burial on 12 November 1360 of "les deux filles du duc de Normandie" at "Saint-Anthoine près de Paris".)
3. Joan (Château de Vincennes, 6 June 1366 (Note: The Chronique des règnes de Jean II et de Charles V records that 7 June 1366 "la royne de France...Jehanne fille du duc de Bourbon" gave birth to "une fille au Bois de Vincennes...Jehanne".) – 21 December 1366, Hôtel de Saint-Pol, Paris (Note: The Chronique des règnes de Jean II et de Charles V records the death on 21 December 1366 of "madame Jehanne fille du...roy de France Charles...en l’ostel de la Conciergerie de l’ostel du Roy...près de Saint-Pol" and her burial "en l’eglise Saint-Denis en France".)), interred at Saint Denis Basilica.
4. Charles VI (3 December 1368 – 22 October 1422), King of France.
5. Marie (Paris, 27 February 1370 – June 1377, Paris).
6. Louis (13 March 1372 – 23 November 1407), Duke of Orléans.
7. Isabella (Paris, 24 July 1373 – 23 February 1378, Paris).
8. John (1374/76 – died young). (Note: Le Laboureur records that Charles V had "trois fils, dont le dernier nommé Jean estant mort en enfance", adding that "il n’en est fait aucune mention dans les histoires" but without noting his own source on which he bases the information.)
9. Catherine (Paris, 4 February 1378 – November 1388, buried at Abbaye De Maubuisson, France), m. John of Berry, Count of Montpensier (son of John, Duke of Berry).

With his reputed mistress Biette de Cassinel, (Note: "Although Biette Cassinel has been attached occasionally to Charles V, no concrete evidence for a relationship exists.") he had no known issue.

With an unknown mistress, he had:

1. Oudard d'Attainville (died 1415).

== Bibliography ==
- Adams, Tracy; Adams, Christine (2020). The Creation of the French Royal Mistress: From Agnès Sorel to Madame Du Barry. The Pennsylvania State University Press. doi:10.1515/9780271086446. ISBN 978-0-271-08644-6. S2CID 241409383.
- Autrand, Françoise (1994). Charles V le Sage (in French). Paris: Fayard.
- Cazelles, Raymond. Société politique, noblesse et couronne sous Jean le Bon et Charles V (in French). Switzerland: Librairie Droz.
- de Mézières, Philippe. Songe du Vieil Pèlerin (in French).
- de Pisan, Christine (1400). Livre des faits et bonnes mœurs du sage roy Charles V (in French).
- Delachenal, Roland (1909). Charles V (in French). Paris: Picardie. OL 24145627M.
- —— (1910). Chronique des règnes de Jean II et de Charles V: 1364-1380. Les grandes Chroniques de France (in French). Paris: H. Laurens. OL 18764391M.
- Delisle, Léopold. Recherches sur la librairie de Charles V, roi de France, 1337–1380 (in French). Paris: H. Campion.
- Guicciardini, Francesco (1969). The History of Italy. Translated by Alexander, Sidney. Princeton University Press.
- Guiffrey, Jules (1868). Histoire de la réunion du Dauphiné à la France. Paris: Académie des bibliophiles.
- Henneman, John Bell (1971). Royal taxation in Fourteenth Century France, The Development of War Financing 1322–1356. Princeton University Press. doi:10.1515/9781400869435. ISBN 978-1-400-86943-5.
- Henneman, John Bell (1996). Olivier de Clisson and Political Society in France Under Charles V and Charles VI. Philadelphia: University of Pennsylvania Press. doi:10.9783/9781512802573. ISBN 978-1-512-80257-3.
- Keane, Marguerite (2016). Material Culture and Queenship in 14th-century France: The Testament of Blanche of Navarre (1331–1398). Brill.
- Kibler, William W.; Zinn, Grover A., eds. (2011) [1995]. Medieval France: An Encyclopedia. New York and London: Routledge. ISBN 978-1-351-66566-7.
- Le Laboureur, Jean (1663). Histoire De Charles VI. Roy de France (in French). Paris: Billaine. OL 3549218M.
- Merlet, Lucien (1852). "Biographie de Jean de Montagu, grand maître de France (1350-1409)". Bibliothèque de l'École des chartes. 13: 248–284. doi:10.3406/bec.1852.445064.
- Petit, Ernest [in French] (1905). Histoire des ducs de Bourgogne de la race Capétienne (in French). Paris: Libraire Le Chevalier.
- Quillet, Jeannine (2002). Charles V, Le Roi lettré (in French). Paris: Librairie académique Perrin.
- Raunié, Émile (1890). Épitaphier du vieux Paris. Histoire générale de Paris (in French). Paris: Impr. nationale. OCLC 910306761.
- Sarindar-Fontaine, François (2019). Charles V le Sage – Dauphin, duc et régent (1338–1358) (in French). L'Harmattan. ISBN 978-2-343-17371-9.
- Sarindar-Fontaine, François (2023). Charles V le Sage - ou les limites d'un grand règne (in French). L'Harmattan. ISBN 978-2-140-34126-7.

Charles V of France House of Valois Cadet branch of the Capetian dynasty Born: 21 January 1338 Died: 16 September 1380
Regnal titles
Preceded by John II	King of France; 8 April 1364 – 16 September 1380	Succeeded by Charles VI
Vacant Merged into the crown Title last held by John II	Duke of Normandy; 1355 – 8 April 1364	Vacant Merged into the crown Title next held by Charles II
Preceded by Humbert II	Dauphin of Viennois; 16 July 1349 – 3 December 1368	Succeeded by Charles II
