= Les Très Belles Heures de Notre-Dame =

14-15th-centuries illuminated book

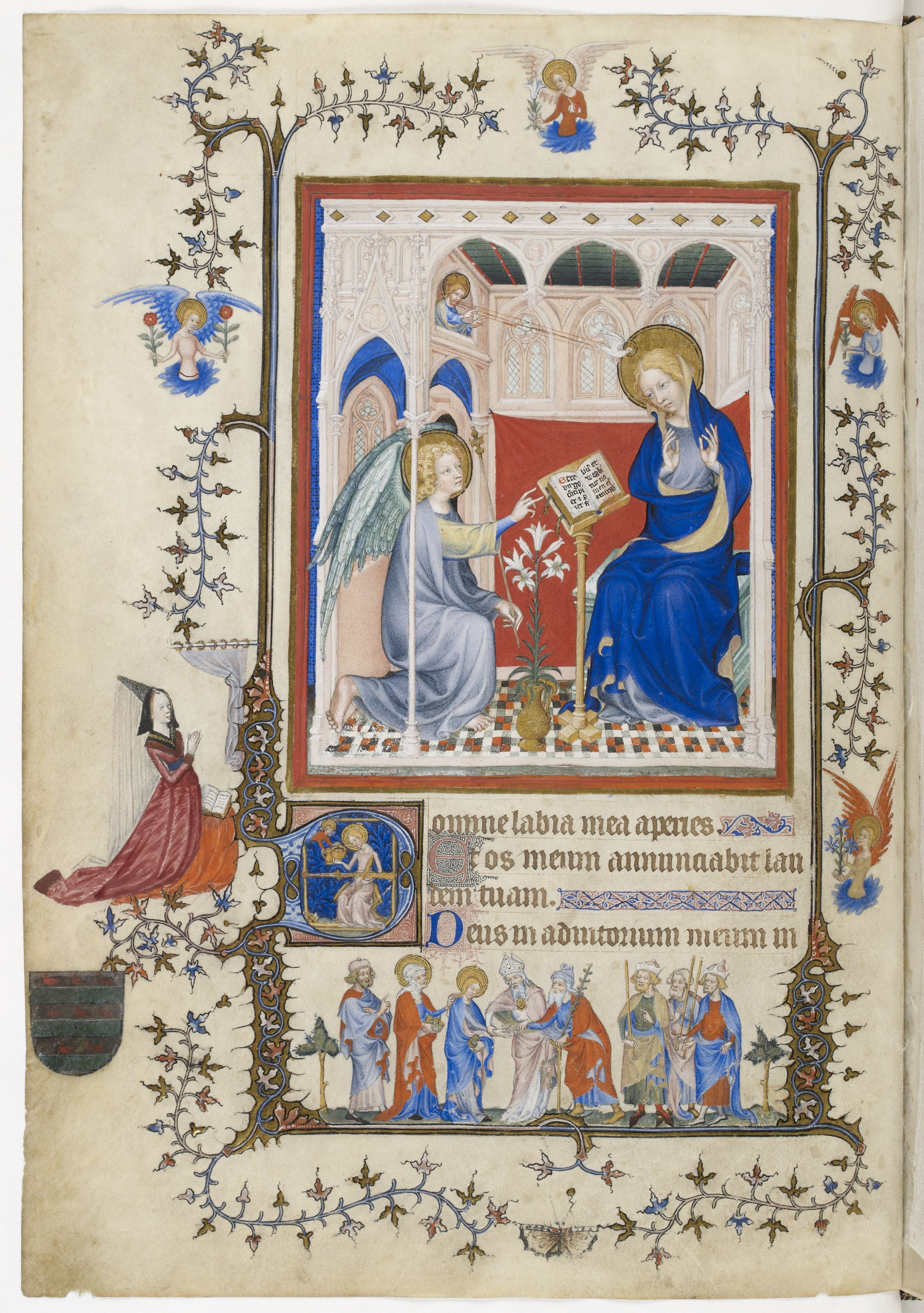
Annunciation, book of hours, f.2

The Très Belles Heures de Notre-Dame is an illuminated manuscript commissioned by the French prince John, Duke of Berry in 1389, whose production was probably interrupted around 1409. It seems to have been conceived, very unusually, as a combined book of hours, prayer-book and missal, all parts to be lavishly illustrated.The manuscript was never completed and very early in its life it seems to have been split up, with the book of hours proper, whose illumination was largely complete, now in the Bibliothèque nationale de France (NAL 3093) and known as Les Très Belles Heures de Notre-Dame ("The Very Beautiful Hours of Our Lady"). The missal portion is known as the Turin–Milan Hours and is mostly in Turin's Museo Civico d'Arte Antica (ms. inv. No. 47) and a prayer book mostly lost in a fire in Turin in 1904 (except for one folio in the Louvre as RF2022-2024 and another in the Getty Center as Ms.67).

== History ==
=== Duke of Berry ===
The Duke's identity as the work's commissioner is proven by it featuring two portraits of him, one praying before the Madonna and Child (prayer book, f.78v) and another in the border of the image of the Holy Trinity in the missal (f.87), even if the latter hardly looks like him. His coat of arms is shown on the mortuary dais at the start of the Office for the Dead (book of hours, f.46) and his symbol of the bear is shown on the painting of his patron saint John the Baptist. The calendar at the start of the book of hours mentions several saints with links to Paris (Genevieve and Marcellus), the French royal court (Louis, Louis of Toulouse) and Berry's capital Bourges (Ursinus and William) and commemorates the Duke's late first wife Joan of Armagnac, his parents and his brother. (Note: p. 256-258)

The texts were commissioned from 1389 onwards in large letters in the Parisian style of Jean l'Avenant, from the same studio as had already written the text for Les Petites Heures de Jean de Berry. The first set of illuminations was begun in 1390, but the work was not mentioned in the 1402 catalogue of the Duke's library (presumably as it was not yet complete), though it is recorded that the Duke acquired a bookmark decorated with a ruby and pearls for his "très belles heures de Notre Dame". According to Inès Villela-Petit, this shows that the book had already been split up by this date. (Note: p. 142)

In 1412 the Duke gave the Très Belles Heures de Notre-Dame to Robinet d'Étampes, guardian of the ducal jewels, possibly for his birthday. The second catalogue of the Duke's books dates to 1413 and mentions both the book and the bookmark, showing that the gift had been only the book of hours and not the whole work. The missal and the prayer book were therefore already partly linked and largely incomplete. (Note: p. 254-255)

=== Book of Hours at the BNF ===
The book of hours long remained in the Étampes family, belonging to Marguerite de Beauvillier, wife of Robert d'Étampes, who became Charles VII of France's chamberlain in 1438. They replaced the Duke's portrait and coat of arms with their own (f.7v and 84). It was then owned by the lords then marquises of la Ferté-Imbault. It is now in an 18th-century binding with the coat of arms of the Duplessis-Châtillon family, who were linked to the Étampes family. It was next in Count Victor de Saint-Mauris's collection, then that of Auguste de Bastard and finally those of Adolph and then Maurice de Rothschild. The Germans looted the work from Paris during the Second World War, but it was returned at the war's end and the Rothschild family gave it to the BNF in 1956. This part of the manuscript now contains 25 out of the original 31 miniatures.

=== Missal and prayerbook in Turin ===
Often known as the Turin–Milan Hours, this part of the manuscript contained a missal and a book of prayers addressed to specific saints and was sold by Robinet d'Étampes. Some time later it was acquired by a member of the Bavière-Hollande family, who added his coat of arms. Folio 59, now destroyed, showed a prince on horseback beside the sea, stopping to pray, surrounded by his entourage, five women and a kneeling old man. Historians think this is either William IV of Hainaut, his brother John III of Bavaria or his daughter Jacqueline, Countess of Hainaut, though some consensus has gathered around John. The first miniatures in this new phase may be by a young Jan van Eyck in 1422–1425, a period when he was producing several works for John of Bavaria in The Hague, or by van Eyck-inspired collaborating artists from 1435 onwards.

The work then belonged to the House of Savoy, either via Philip III of Burgundy's sister Agnes, mother-in-law of Philip II of Savoy, or via Margaret of Austria, wife of Philibert II of Savoy and granddaughter of Charles the Bold. Next it belonged to Christine of France, Henry IV's daughter and Victor Amadeus I, Duke of Savoy's wife - it may have been her who split the book up again in the mid 17th century. The missal includes a bookplate of the count of Aglié, a close friend of the duchess, and was acquired around 1800 by prince Gian Giacomo Trivulzio of Milan, who died in 1831. In 1935 his descendant Luigi Alberico Trivulzio gave it to the Museo Civico in Turin. (Note: p.144-145)

The prayer book stayed in the Savoy family collection and was split up into separate folios - four were acquired by the Louvre in 1896 and another recently rediscovered one is now in the Getty Center. The manuscript itself was added to the University of Turin library in 1723. A sixth folio showing the Deposition of Christ was stolen in August 1725, whilst the manuscript itself was destroyed in a fire at the library on 26 January 1904. Paul Durrieu produced a reproduction of the manuscript's illuminations in 1902, allowing it to be reconstructed. (Note: p. 145)

== Composition ==
Relatively rare in containing offices, prayers and a book of hours, the work's composition was inspired by that of the Très Belles Grandes Heures de Charles V - they both contain a prayer to the sovereign and another to the king of France. Notre-Dame originally contained 343 folios, of which a hundred bore illuminations.

Organisation of the Book of Hours proper (Note: p. 12-150)
| Chapter | Folios | Number of miniatures | Example |
|---|---|---|---|
| Calendar | Folios 1 to 6v | No miniature | |
| Office of the Virgin | Folios 7 to 45v | 8 large miniatures (Matins / Vigil : Annunciation, Lauds : Visitation, Prime : Nativity, Terce : Adoration of the Magi, Sext: Presentation in the Temple, None : Jesus Among the Doctors, Vespers : Wedding at Cana, Compline : Coronation of the Virgin) | |
| Penitential psalms and Office of the Dead | Folios 46 to 85v | 1 large miniature (Vespers for the dead : funeral in a church) and 1 disappeared miniature | |
| Prayers of the Passion | Folios 84 to 87r | 1 large miniature (Christ borne by two angels) | |
| Office of the Holy Spirit | Folio 87v to 96v | 6 large miniatures (Matins / Vigil : Baptism of Christ, Lauds : Descent of the Holy Spirit, Prime : Resurrection of the Dead, None : Prayer to the Holy Spirit, Vespers : Those who fear the Lord, Compline : The Apostles Scattered) and 2 disappeared miniatures (Terce and Sext) | |
| Office of the Passion | Folios 97 to 118v | 7 large miniatures (Matins / Vigil : Jesus Arrested, Lauds : Christ Before Caiaphas, Prime : Christ Before Pilate, Terce : Flagellation, Sext : Christ Bearing the Cross, None : Crucifixion, Vespers : Descent from the Cross) and 1 disappeared (Compline) | |
| Prayers to the Trinity and to the choir of angels | Folios 119 to 126v | 2 grandes miniatures (Adoration of the Trinity and Adoration of God) and 1 disappeared (The Duke of Berry returning from a journey) | |

Organisation of the prayer book (mostly destroyed)
| Chapter | Folio | Number of miniatures | Example |
|---|---|---|---|
| Calendar | Folios 1 to 12 | 12 destroyed miniatures at the bottom of the page (January: Banquet Scene, February: Pruning Trees, March: Fishing, April: Tending the Garden, May: Cavalcade, June: Young People in a Garden, July: Haymaking, August: Harvest, September: Winepressing, October: Labours, November: Slaughtering Cows and Pigs, December: Street Scene) | |
| Three prayers to almighty God | Folios 14 to 16v | 1 destroyed large miniature (God the Father in Celestial Light), 1 disappeared and 1 large miniature in the Louvre (God the Father in Majesty) | |
| Office of the Compassion of the Virgin | Folios 24 to 39 | 7 destroyed large miniatures (Matins / Vigil : Christ Arrested, Lauds : Christ Crowned with Thorns, Prime : Flagellation, Terce : Christ Bearing the Cross, Sext : Christ Nailed to the Cross, None : Crucifixion, Vespers : Descent from the Cross) and 1 disappeared | |
| Prayers for laypeople to say during a mass | Folios 39v to 49v | 8 destroyed large miniatures (Before the start of mass : God in Majesty, before the Gospel reading : Procession in a church, after the offertory : The Trinity Enthroned, after the sanctus : Christ as the Gate of Paradise, after the Agnus Dei : Donor Before the Lord, before communion : Communion in a private chapel, Prayer of Anselm of Canterbury : Pietà) and 1 large miniature in the Louvre (After communion : Double intercession) | |
| Prayers of intercession to the saints | Folios 50 to 56v | 1 destroyed large miniature (Christ, Martha and Julian the Hospitaller in a Sailing Boat) | |
| Prayers addressed to the saints | Folios 57 to 91 | 12 destroyed large miniatures (John the Baptist in the Desert, Patriarchs, prophets and apostles, Mary Magdalene and the anointing at Bethany, The Virgin Mary among the virgins, A prince's prayer : seaside scene with knights, Commentary on the Lord's Prayer : sermon on the mount, Prayer for a journey : traveller in danger, Saint Thomas Aquinas in his study, Jesus Blessing, Prayer of a king of France : king praying in his tent, Prayer to Mary : Jean de Berry praying before the mother of God, Abbreviated psalter of saint Jerome : saint Jerome in his study), 3 large miniatures in the Louvre (Martyrdom scene, Confessor saints, Virgin and Saint John the Evangelist enthroned), 1 miniature in the Getty (Christ Blessing), 2 disappeared miniatures. | |

Organisation of the Missal
| Chapter | Folios | Number of miniatures | Example |
|---|---|---|---|
| Temporal | Folios 1 to 93 | 13 large miniatures (Annunciation, Mary and Joseph Adoring the Christ Child, Adoration of the Magi, Presentation of Jesus in the Temple, Christ Enters Jerusalem, Jesus on the Mount of Olives, The Thirty Pieces of Silver, Crucifixion, Women at the Tomb and the Resurrected Christ, Ascension, Descent of the Holy Spirit, Holy Trinity, Last Supper) | |
| Masses of the saints | Folios 93v to 115 | 8 large miniatures (Birth of Saint John the Baptist, Saint Peter Freed from Prison, Coronation of the Virgin, Birth of the Virgin Mary, Michael the Archangel victorious over the Devil, Miracle of the Pool of Bethesda, Saint Hilarius preaching, The blessed in heaven) | |
| Votive masses | Folios 116 à 127 | 4 large miniatures (Funeral in a church, Saint Helena finding the True Cross, Lactation with an adoring figure, Crucifixion of Saint Andrew) | |

== Painters ==
The work's history is complex and remains controversial. Several distinct hands can be seen - the Belgian art historian Georges Hulin de Loo identified eleven main artists in 1911 (lettered A to K), whilst Anne Van Buren identified up to thirty.

=== Hand A ===
Hand A began under the leadership of Jean d'Orléans (active 1361-1407), also known as the Master of the Parement, who is named after the 1375 grisailles on the Parement de Narbonne, now in the Louvre. For that work, Jean d'Orléans employed collaborators such as the Master of the Coronation of Charles VI, Jean Petit, also known as the Pseudo-Jacquemart. The first phase of the illumination of the Heures may have broken off for an unknown reason around 1404-1405 only to resume in 1409. Jean d'Orléans is definitely the artist for most of the miniatures in the Office of the Virgin as well as the large illustrations for the Office of the Dead and the Prayers of the Passion. This latter interruption was due to Jean d'Orléans's death and his studio breaking up.

=== Hands B, C and D ===
The Master of the John the Baptist and the Master of the Holy Spirit took part in the second phase.

=== Hand E ===
The Limbourg brothers entered the duke's service in 1405 and added three miniatures at the end of the work around 1410-1412 - The Adoration of the Holy Trinity, The Adoration of God the Father and Journey of the Duke de Berry. The third of these is now lost, though a lithograph of it was made by Auguste de Bastard, one of the manuscript's former owners.

=== Hand F ===
This hand produced miniatures at the bottom of pages and decorated initials as well as retouching faces on the same pages. Some have identified him as an artist in the Bedford Master's studio, which would date his contribution to 1435, whilst others argue he is one of the Masters of Zweder van Culemborg, from the name of the missal for a bishop of Utrecht, right at the start of the 1430s but before the van Eyckian hands G and H.

=== Hands G, H, I and J ===
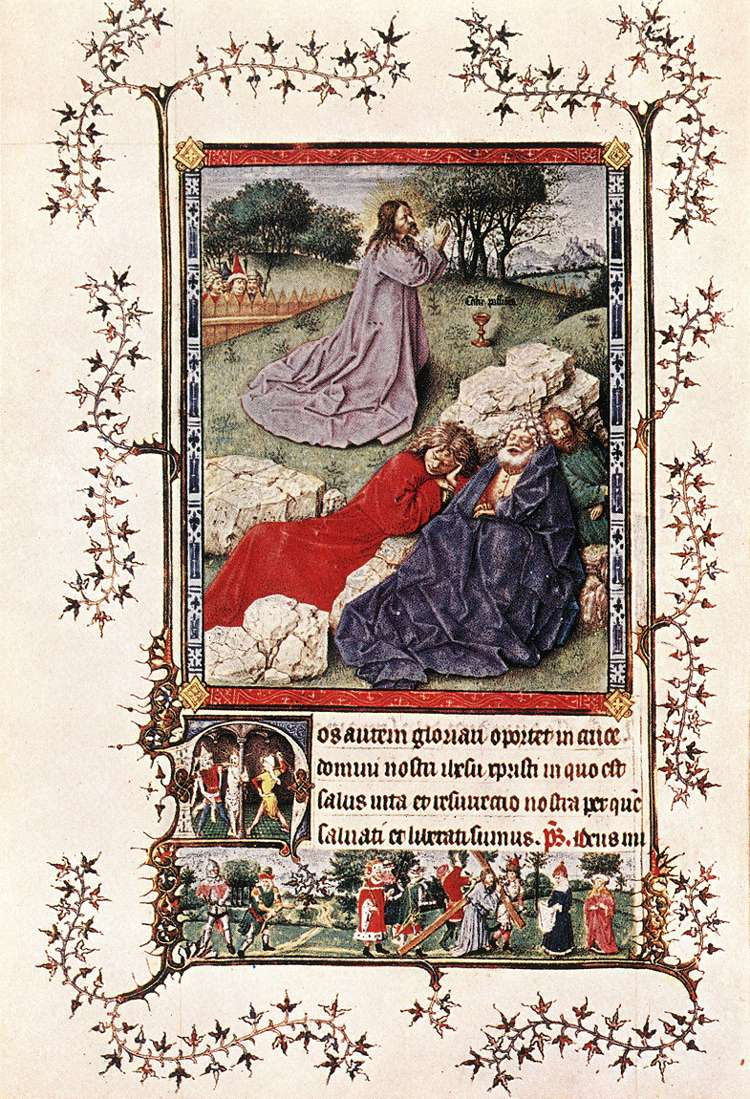
Christ on the Mount of Olives, missel, f.30v attributed to Master H, van Eyck's studio, 1430s

Miniatures were then added to the manuscript, probably from 1422-1424 onwards. They have been attributed to Jan and Hubert van Eyck's studio due to their style. Jan was then court painter to John of Bavaria. Three different hands can be made out in these miniatures added in a first phase (masters H, I and J), without being able to establish which van Eyck brother or which other painter from their studio produced them. A second phase occurred in the 1430s, maybe in the hands of masters G and H or of Jan himself. Another phase came around 1435, maybe commissioned by a new owner, showing Prayer of a traveller in peril (Prayers, f.71v) - the heraldic symbols combine those of the kings of France and the dukes of Burgundy, which suggests a date after the 1435 Treaty of Arras.

=== Hand K ===
A final phase occurred around 1447-1450. Who commissioned it is unknown, but it may have been the same man as the previous phase but slightly older, shown in a fur-trimmed cloak praying before God the Father (Prières, f.46v). A calendar for the Burgundian Netherlands usage was added to the manuscript in this final phase, which is generally attributed to the Master of the Llangattock Hours, named after a manuscript now in the Getty Center.

== Bibliography ==
- (in French) François Avril, Nicole Reynaud and Dominique Cordellier (ed.), Les Enluminures du Louvre, Moyen Âge et Renaissance, Paris, Hazan - Louvre éditions, juillet 2011, 384 p. (ISBN 978-2-7541-0569-9), p. 140-156 (notices 77-80 edited by Inès Villela-Petit).
- Châtelet, Albert (1980). Early Dutch Painting, Painting in the Northern Netherlands in the fifteenth century. Lausanne: Montreux Fine Art. ISBN 2-88260-009-7..
- (in French) Châtelet, Albert (1993). Jan van Eyck enlumineur: les Heures de Turin et de Milan-Turin. Strasbourg..
- (in French) Dominique Deneffe, 'La Miniature eyckienne », in Bernard Bousmanne and Thierry Delcourt, Miniatures flamandes : 1404-1482, Bibliothèque nationale de France/Bibliothèque royale de Belgique, 2012, 464 p. (ISBN 9782717724998), p. 166-171.
- (in French) Hagopian-Van Buren, Anne; Marrow, James H.; Pettenati, Silvana (1994–1996). Heures de Turin-Milan - Inv. NÊ 47, Museo civico d'arte antica, Turin. Vol. 2. Luzern: Faksimile Verlag. ISBN 978-3-85672-048-3. - a complete facsimile of the Turin manuscript.
- (in French) Hulin de Loo, Georges (1911). Les Heures de Milan : troisième partie des Très Belles Heures de Notre-Dame, enluminées par les peintres de Jean de France, du de Berry et par ceux du duc Guillaume de Bavière, comte de Hainaut et de Hollande. Bruxelles, Paris: Van Oest..
- (in French) König, Eberhard (1992). Die Très belles Heures de Notre-Dame des Herzogs von Berry: Handschrift Nouv. acq. lat. 3093, Bibliothèque nationale, Paris. Vol. 2. Luzern: Faksimile Verlag. ISBN 3-85672-040-5. - a complete facsimile of the BNF manuscript
- (in French) König, Eberhard; Boespflug, François (October 1998). Les « Très Belles Heures » du duc Jean de France, duc de Berry. Images & Beaux livres. Le Cerf. ISBN 2-204-05416-X. - contains all known miniatures from the manuscript.
- (in French) (in English) (in German) Marrow, James; Pattenati, Silvia; Buren, Anne H. van (1996). Heures de Turin-Milan : Inv.N.° 47 Museo Civico d'Arte Antica Torino – Commentaire. Lucerne: Luzern Faksimile Verlag..
- James Marrow, 'History, Historiography, and Pictorial Invention in the Turin-Milan Hours', In Detail: New Studies of Northern Renaissance Art in Honor of Walter S. Gibson, Turnhout, Laurinda S. Dixon, 1998, p. 1–14.
- Maurits Smeyers, 'Answering some Questions about the Turin-Milan Hours', in Roger van Schoute and Hélène Verougstraete-Marcq, Le dessin sous-jacent dans la peinture : colloque VII, 17–19 septembre 1987, Louvain-la-Neuve, UCL, Inst. Sup. d'Archéol. et d'Histoire de l'art, coll. « Document de travail » (no 24), 1989, p. 55–70.
