= Antependium =

Ornament on the front of a Christian altar

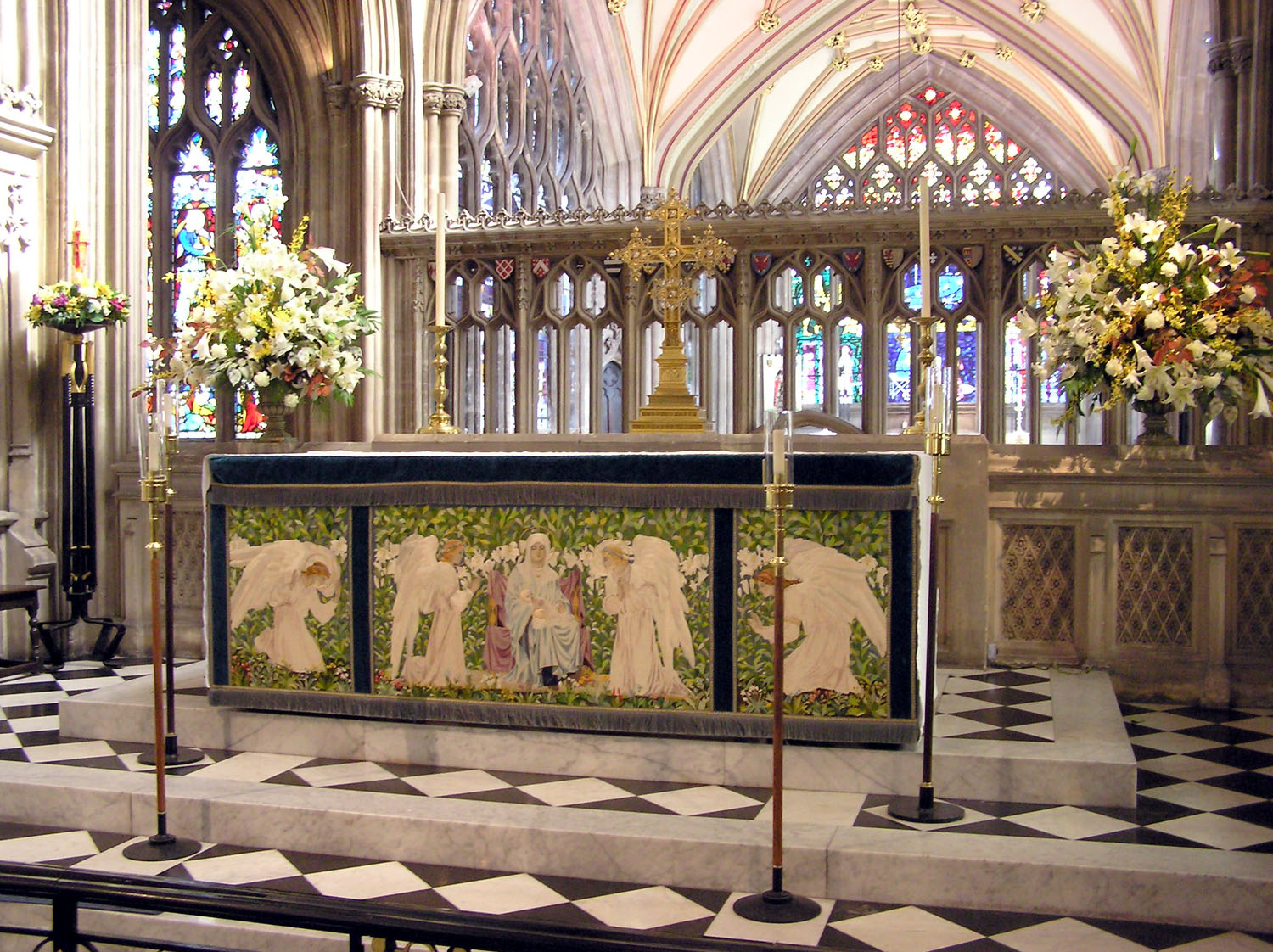
The altar in St Mary's Anglican Church, Redcliffe, Bristol, England. It is decorated with an elaborate frontal in green, a colour typically associated with the seasons after Epiphany and Pentecost.

An antependium (from Latin ante- and pendēre, "to hang before"; pl.: antependia), also known as a pulpit fall, parament or hanging, or, when speaking specifically of the hanging for the altar, an altar frontal (Latin: pallium altaris), is a decorative piece, usually of textile, but also metalwork, stone or other material, that can adorn a Christian altar. It may also apply to the ornamental bookmarks used on some lecterns.

Antependium can also be used to describe the decorated front of the altar itself, especially if it is in an inflexible material such as wood, stone or metal.

Specifically, and as the etymology of the word suggests, an antependium hangs down in front of whatever it covers, and is to be distinguished from the altar linens which are used in the service of the Eucharist, and an altar cloth which covers the top of the altar table (mensa).

The true liturgical decoration of the altar and its oldest adornment is the frontal.

== Types of antependia ==
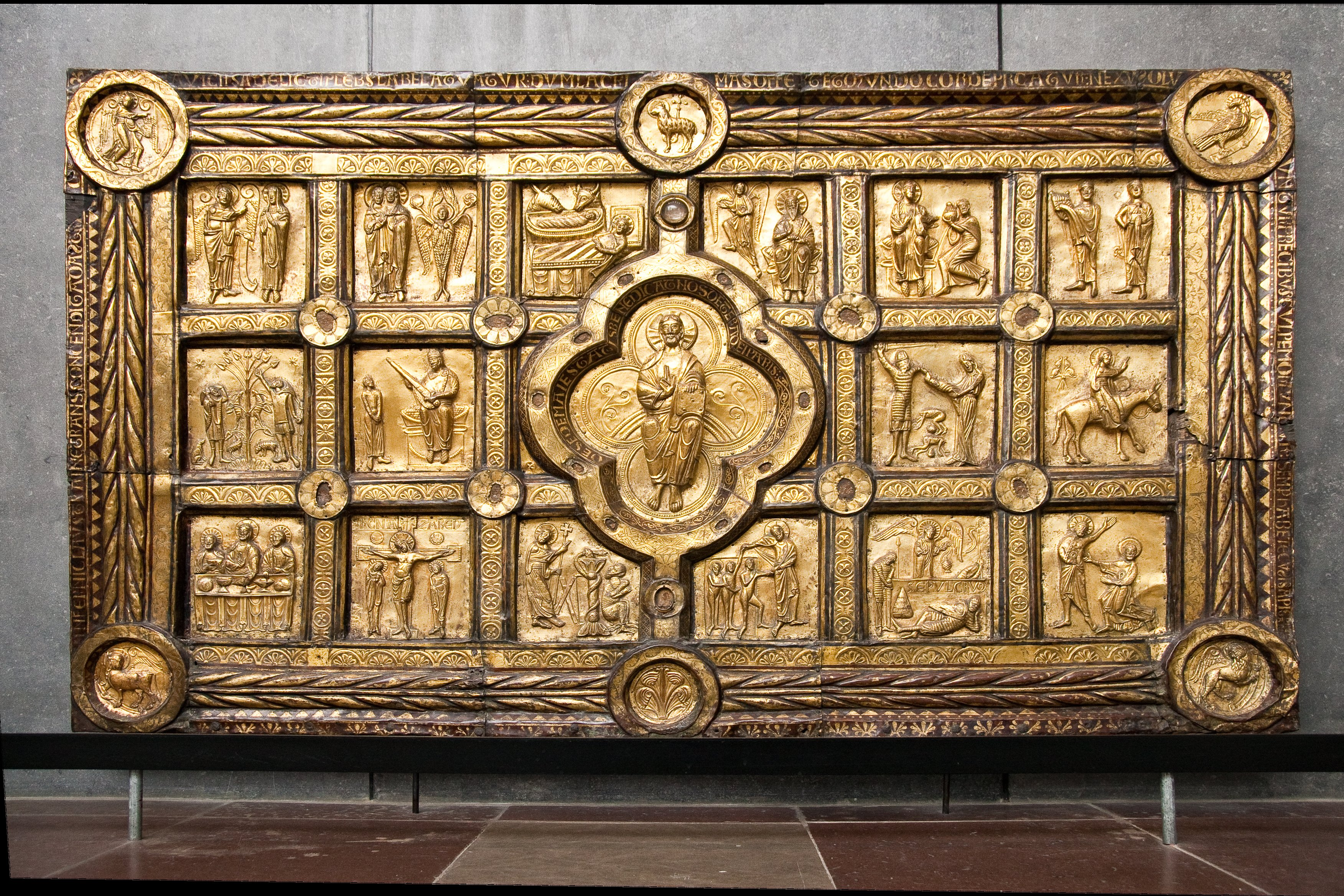
Danish Romanesque gold antependium, once set with gems, c. 1200–1225

=== Western Christianity ===
“Antependium” is the word used for elaborate fixed altar frontals, which, in large churches and especially in the Ottonian art of the Early Medieval period, were sometimes of gold studded with gems, enamels and ivories, and in other periods and churches often carved stone, painted wood panel, stucco, or other materials, such as azulejo tiling in Portugal.

When the front of an altar is elaborately carved or painted, the additional cloth altar frontal normally reaches down only a few inches from the top of the altar table; this is called a “frontlet”. In other cases, it may reach to the floor (properly called a “frontal”). In both situations, it will usually cover the entire width of the altar. A “Jacobean frontal” will cover the entire altar, reaching down to the floor on all four sides if freestanding.

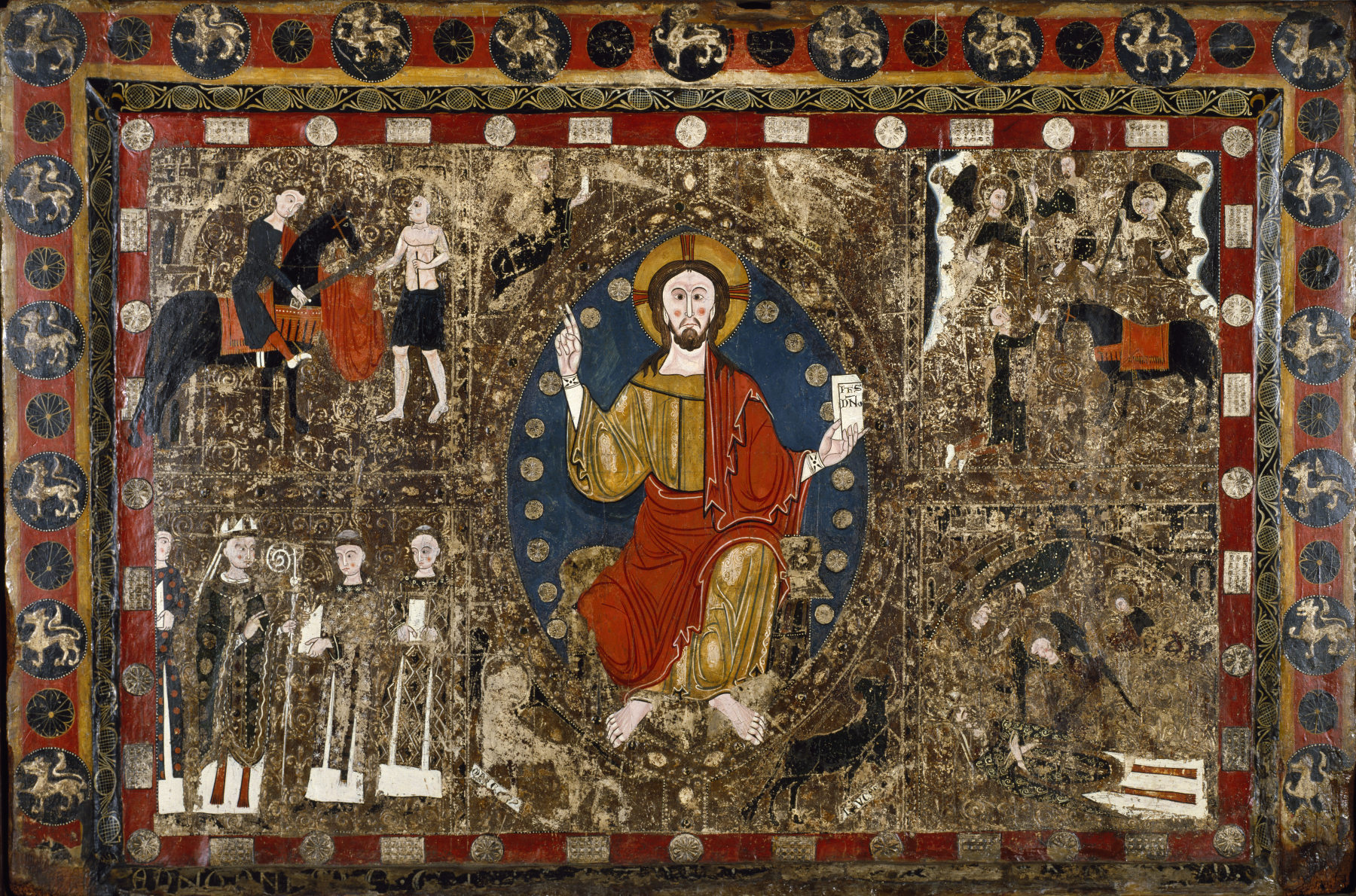
Altar frontal in tempera paint on wood panel and stucco, Spain, Catalonia, c. 1250, depicting the life of St Martin

The Anglican Canons of 1603 order that the Lord's Table should be “covered, in time of Divine Service, with a carpet of silk or other decent stuff, thought meet by the ordinary of the place” (can. 82).

Covers for lecterns and pulpits are generally similar to a frontlet, normally covering the “desk” of the lectern or pulpit, and hanging down about a foot or longer in front (visible to the congregation).

There is little information about the decoration of altars in the first four centuries of Christianity, however, from the 5th century onward there is evidence for the use of altar frontals. Palladius, writing in 421 CE, states that Roman ladies gave their silk dresses to form coverings for the altar.

=== Eastern Christianity ===
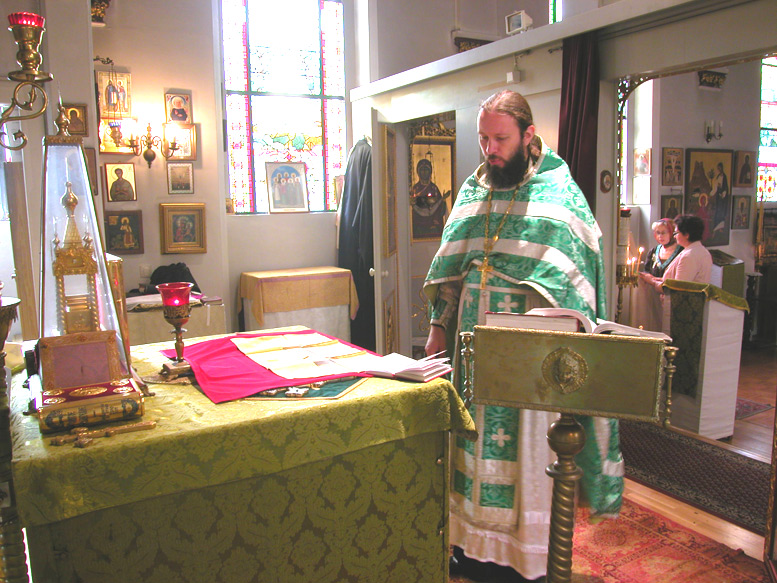
Russian Orthodox priest standing in front of a “fully vested” altar (Düsseldorf, Germany)

In the Orthodox Church, the Holy Table (altar) may be vested in one or two coverings. There is always an outer frontal, covering the top surface of the Holy Table and hanging down several inches on all four sides. This is used alone if the front of the Holy Table is elaborately carved or decorated. For a “fully vested” Holy Table, a second, inner hanging is used. This covers the Holy Table fully on the top and hangs down to the floor on all four sides.

The analogia (icon stands) are also covered with a covering known as a proskynitarion. As with the coverings used on the Holy Table, these may have only one outer covering, or include a second, inner covering hanging to the floor (though, in this case, sometimes only in the front and back).

== Construction ==
A cloth antependium is normally of the same colour and often of the same fabric and similar style as the vestments worn by the clergy. The fabric may vary from very simple material, such as cotton or wool, to exquisitely wrought damasks, fine watermarked silk, velvet, or satin. Embellishment is commonly by means of decorative bands of material called orphreys, embroidery (sometimes in gold or silver thread, or making use of pearls and semi-precious stones) or appliqués, fringes and tassels, all of a complementary colour to the fabric. The most frequently used symbol on both vestments and hangings is the cross. The antependium is normally lined in satin, using a matching hue.

By the 7th to 8th century rich materials were customary in the fabrication of an antependiums, particularly gold embroideries. From the 8th century onward antependia were often made from a variety of materials, including metal, gold, silver, gilt, and enamels.

Italian Antependia

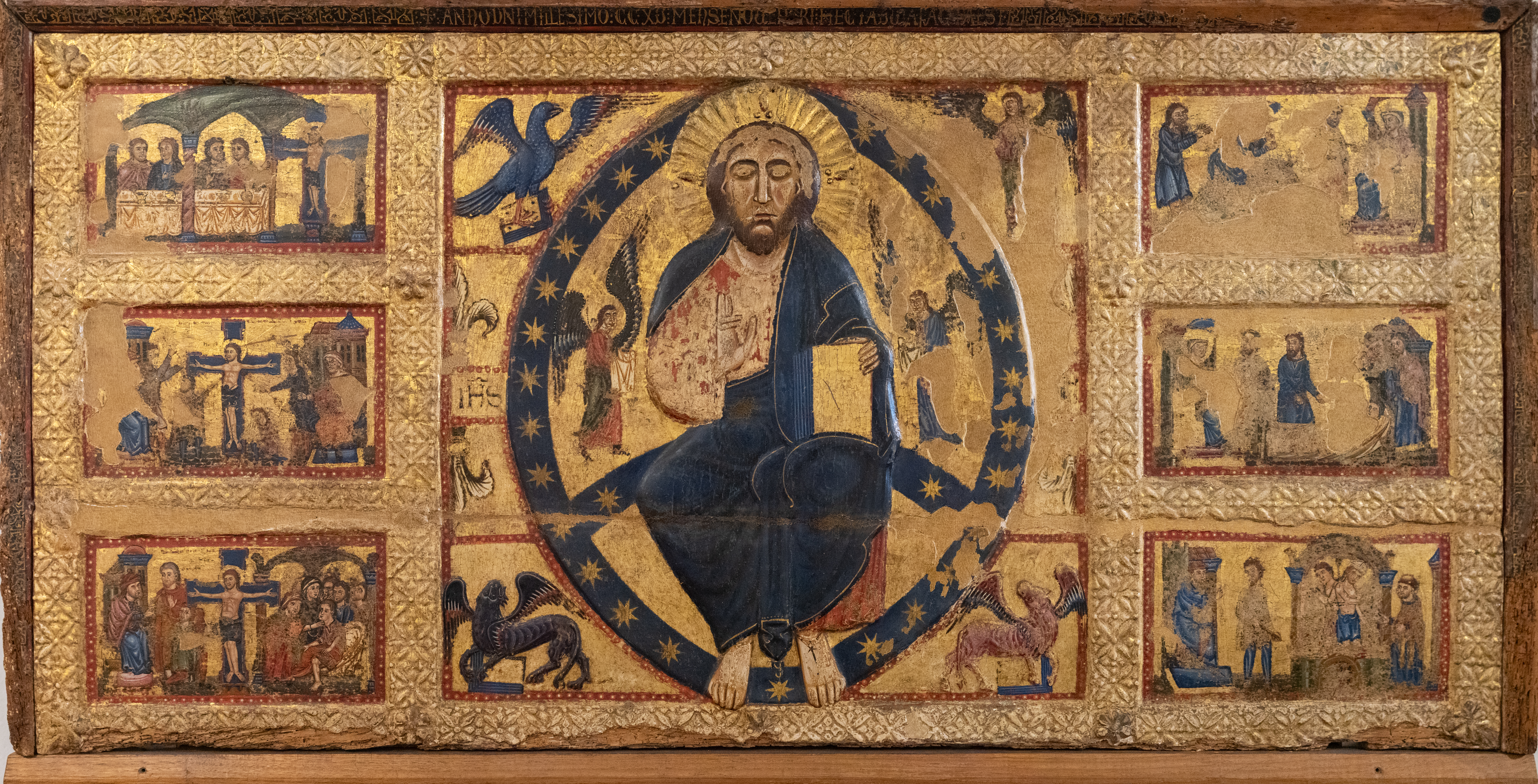
"Il Paliotto del Salvatore", 1215, Siena

The earliest extant painted wooden antependium in Italian art is the one attributed to the Maestro di Tressa in the Pinacoteca Nazionale in Siena, Italy. It is dated 1215 and is tempera and gold on panel, embellished with pastiglia decoration to mimic metalwork. It is generally called "Il Paliotto del Salvatore" or the antependium of the Savior, paliotto being the Italian word for an antependium in any medium.

The upper frame bears the inscription: Anno D[omi]ni Millesimo CCXV: mense Novembri: hec tabula facta est. "In the year of the Lord, One thousand two hundred fifteen: in the month of November: this table was made."

The famous Pala d'Oro in St Mark's Basilica in Venice may have originated as an antependium, although early additions made it far too large, and it is used as a reredos.

== Colours ==
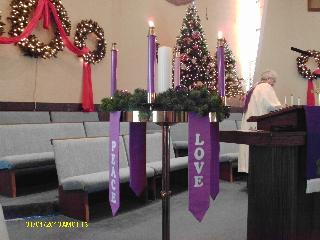
Paraments hanging from an Advent wreath in a Methodist church

The colours used tend to be suggested by the liturgical tradition of each denomination. Most Western Christian churches that observe a developed liturgical tradition use white, gold, red, green, violet and black, with each being used on specified occasions. A rose colour may be employed for the fourth Sunday (Laetare Sunday) in Lent and the third Sunday (Gaudete Sunday) in Advent. In Anglican circles, blue is sometimes prescribed for feasts of the Blessed Virgin Mary (see liturgical colours), although it is also used, unofficially, in some areas of the Roman Catholic Church. Among Eastern Christians, there tend to be two types of vestments: somber (dark) ones and festal (bright) ones. Beyond that, no specific colours are officially required. Among groups such as the Russian Orthodox Church, a pattern of fixed colours has developed, somewhat similar to that used in the West, although they are not, strictly speaking, required.

== Notable examples ==
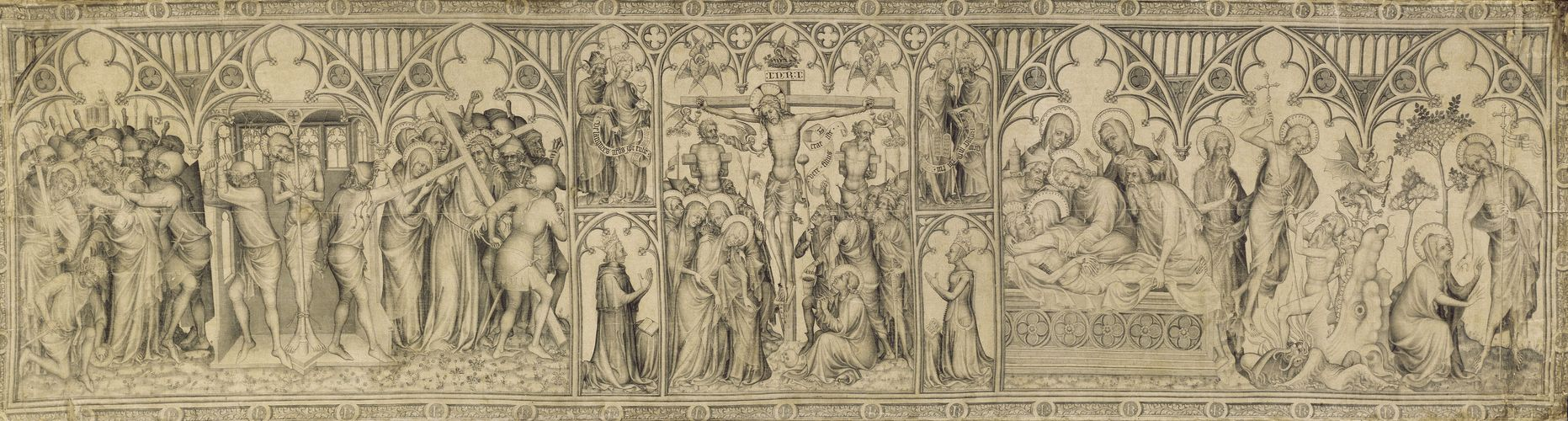
Parement of Narbonne, before 1378

Metalwork

- The "Pala d'Oro" in Aachen Cathedral, with gold relief panels, part of a larger altar ensemble in precious metals, c. 1020
- Basilica of Sant'Ambrogio, Milan, 9th century
- Duomo of Monza, 14th century

Cloth

- Parement of Narbonne, black ink on silk, before 1378, a French royal commission now in the Louvre in Paris. From its colour, very likely used in Lent
