= Museo Civico d'Arte Antica =

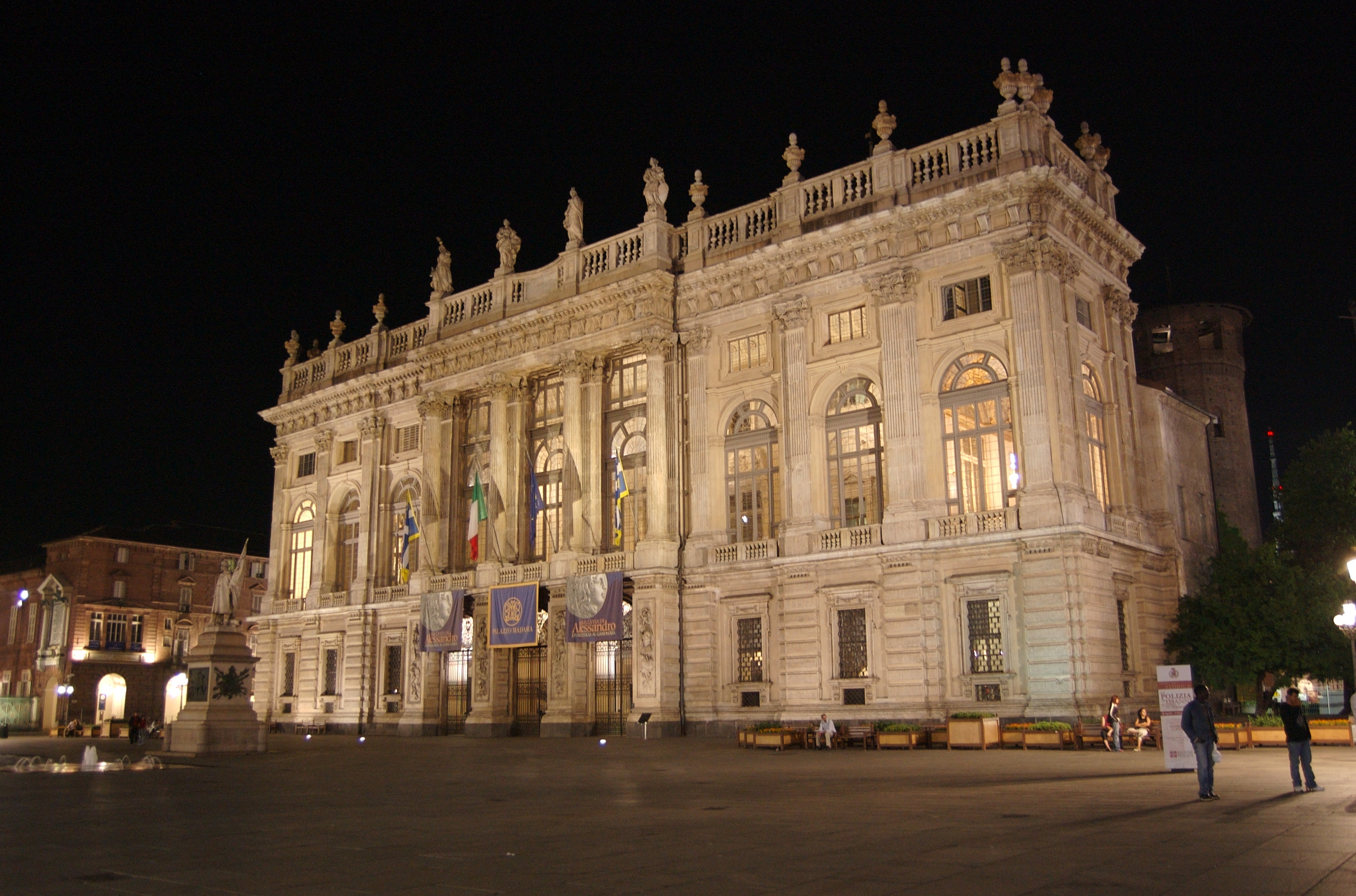

- Location within Turin
- Established: 1934
- Location: Piazza Castello, Turin, Italy
- Coordinates: 45.071097°N 7.685478°E
- Type: Art museum
- Director: Guido Curto
- Owner: Fondazione Torino Musei
- Website: www.palazzomadamatorino.it

The Museo Civico d'Arte Antica is an art museum located in the Palazzo Madama in Turin, Italy. It has a renowned collection of paintings from the medieval, Renaissance and Baroque periods. It reopened in 2006 after several years of restorations.

== History ==
The museum was founded in 1934, as the heir of the Pinacoteca Regia and the Galleria Reale, which had been established in Palazzo Madama by King Charles Albert of Savoy in 1832.

A Civic Museum had been founded in 1860 in the wake of the unification of Italy although, three years later, the collections were moved to another location in Turin, in Via Gaudenzio Ferrari. These were increased gradually with acquisitions from private collectors, from closed residences of the House of Savoy, or from donations by the same family.

In 1898 the collections of "ancient art" were separated from those of "modern art". The former were moved to the current location in 1934 by the director Vittorio Viale.

The collection of Asian art, including rare artifacts from Gandhara uncovered in the excavations by IsMEO at the Butkara Stupa in Pakistan, was transferred to Turin's Museum of Oriental Art in 2008.

== Description ==
The museum includes a total of 35 rooms on four floors. The underground floor is dedicated to medieval works, the first floor to Gothic and Renaissance painting, and the second floor to Baroque works, while the uppermost floor deals with decorations.

Aside from paintings and sculptures, works exhibited also include illuminated manuscripts (such as the Turin–Milan Hours), ceramics, porcelains, maiolica and ivories (mostly of oriental origin), and gold and silver works, as well as a furniture and cloths.

The 15th-century Torre dei Tesori ('Tower of the Treasures') is home to several of the museum most known works: Antonello da Messina's Trivulzio Portrait, the Turin–Milan Hours, and several objects from Charles Emmanuel I's cabinet. Other works include a series of sculptures of the Dead Christ, paintings by Macrino d'Alba, Giacomo Jaquerio, Giovanni Martino Spanzotti, Defendente Ferrari, Antonio Vivarini, Giulio Campi, Gaudenzio Ferrari, Gandolfino da Roreto, Gerolamo Giovenone, Francesco Hayez, sculptors' and goldsmiths' works from the 8th to the 13th centuries, and Piedmontese coats of arms.

The Camera delle Guardie ('Guards Chambers') houses Baroque paintings by artists such as Orazio Gentileschi (Assumption and St. Jerome), Giovanni Battista Crespi, Giulio Cesare Procaccini and Francesco Cairo.

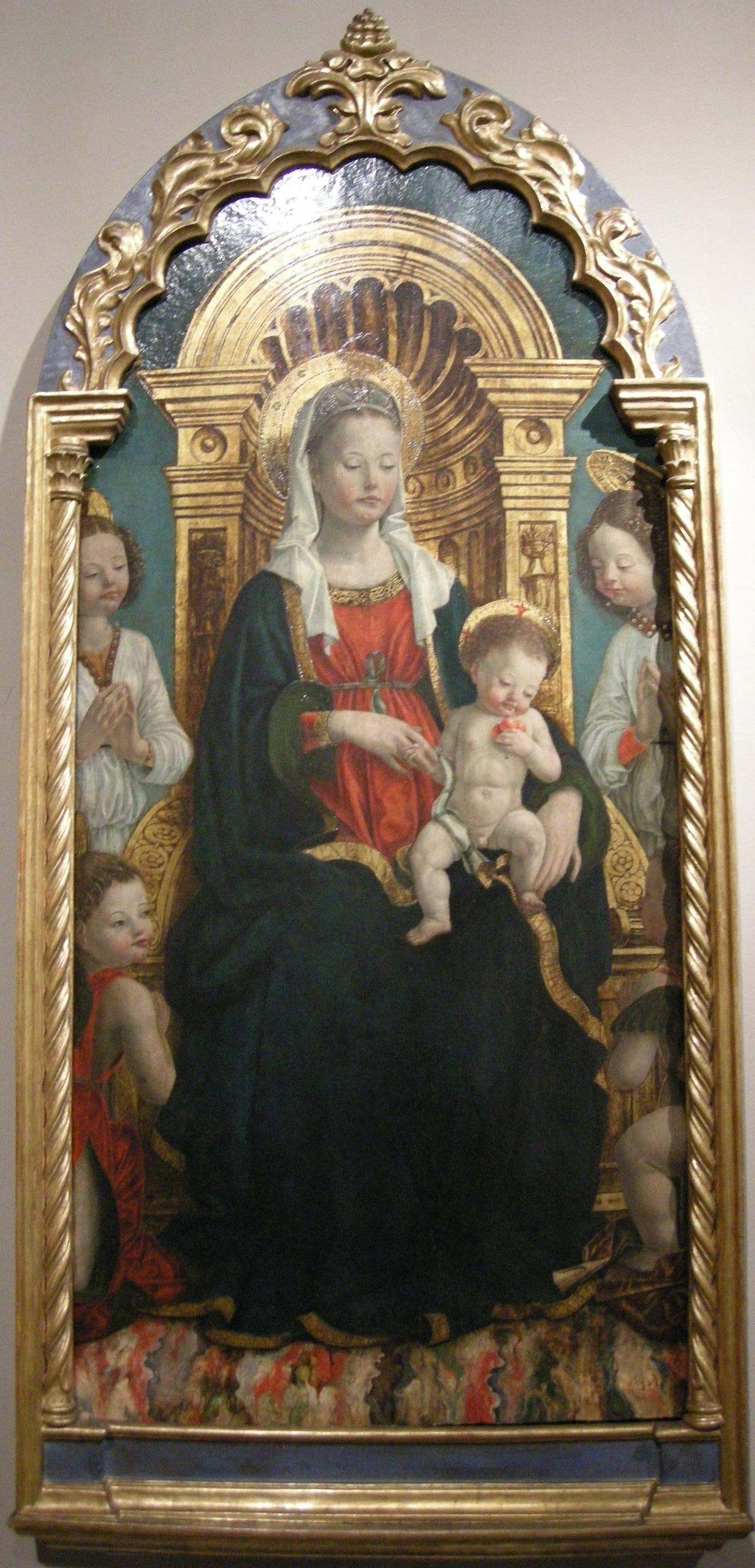
Giovanni Martino Spanzotti, Madonna and Child Enthroned with Four Angels (1475–1480)

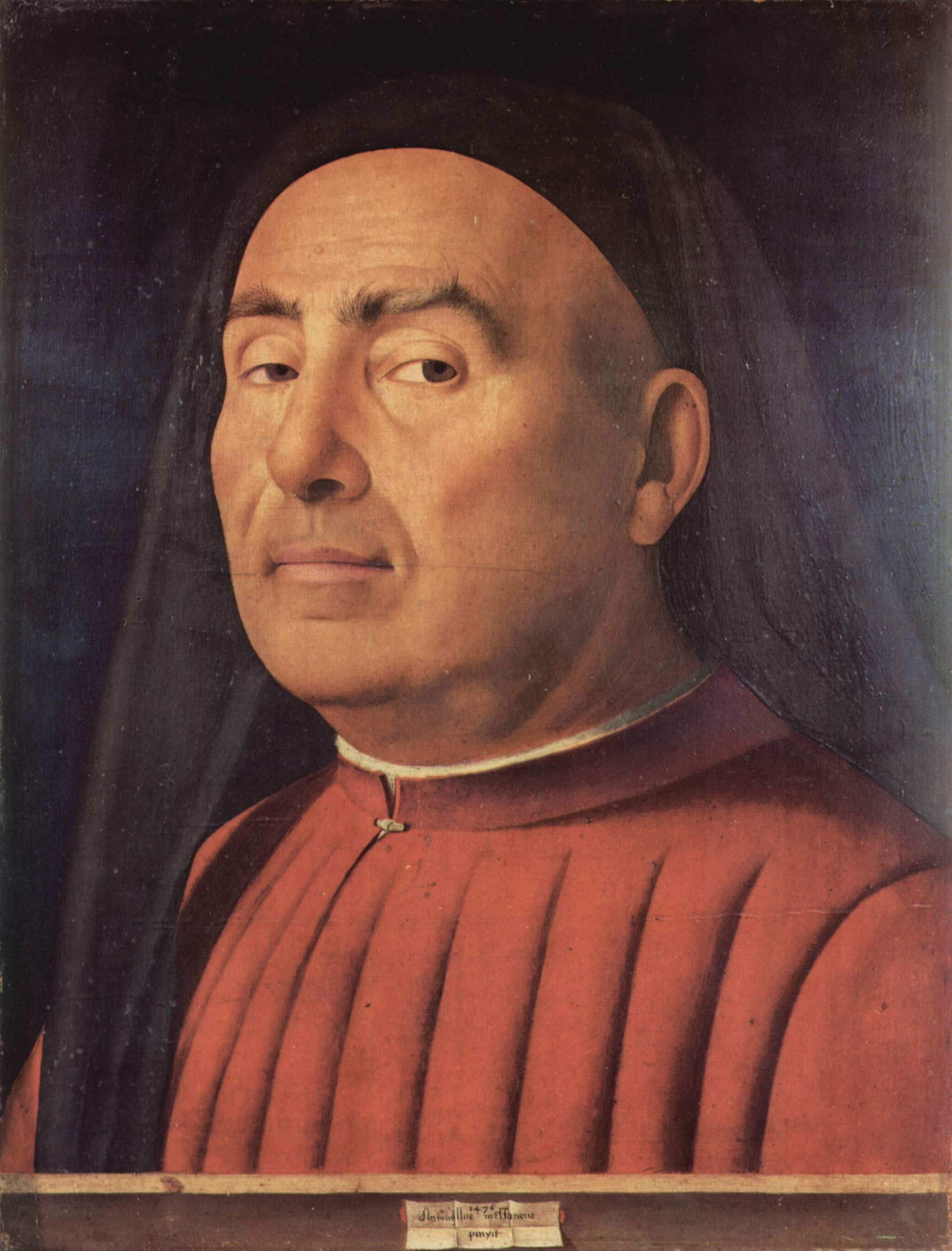
Antonello da Messina, Trivulzio Portrait (1476)

== Sources ==
- Romano, G. (2006). Palazzo Madama a Torino. Da castello medioevale a museo della città. Turin.
