= Portrait of a Fat Man =

Paintings by Robert Campin

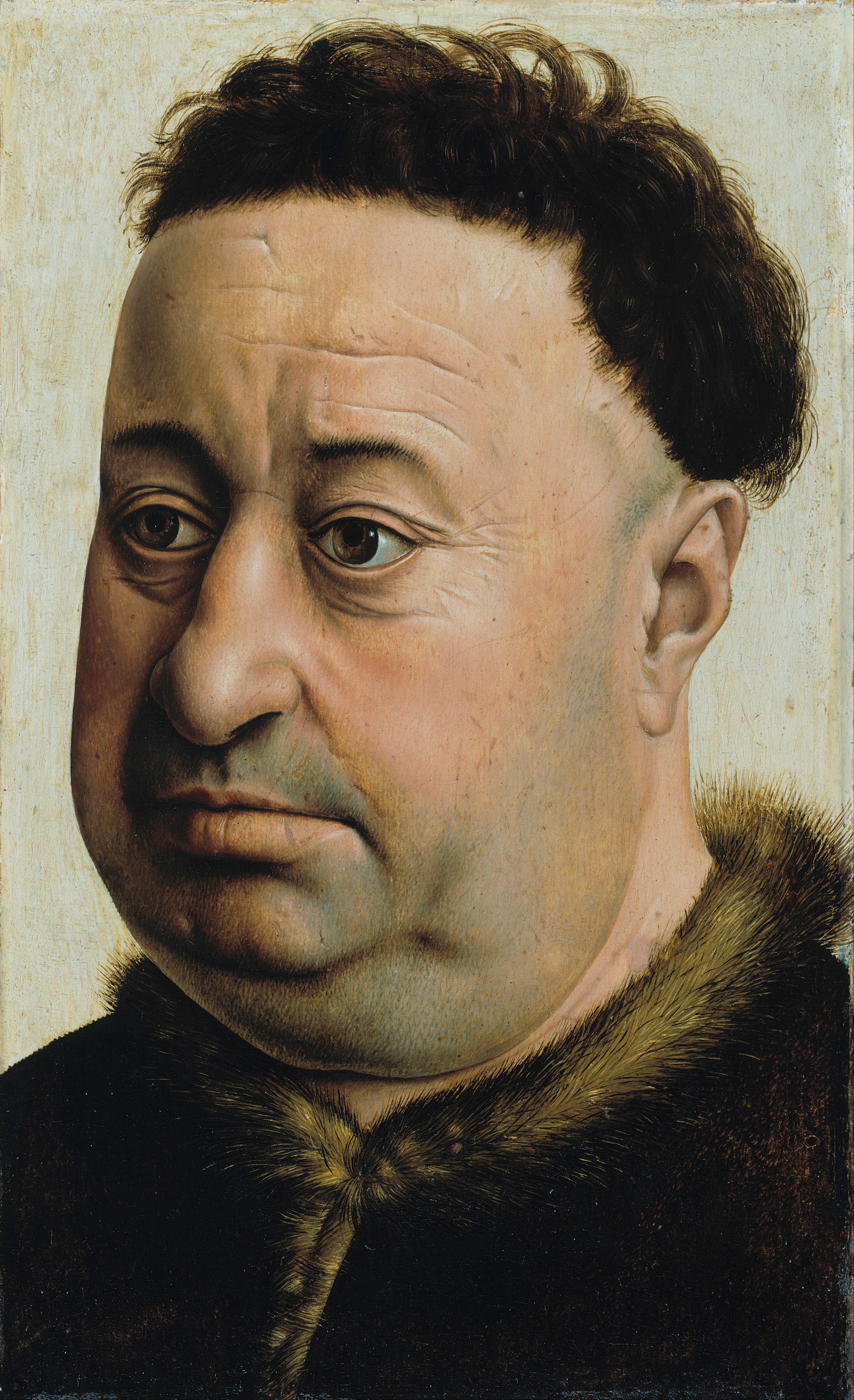
Portrait of a Fat Man, oil on oak wood, 285 mm × 177 mm (11.2 in × 7.0 in). Gemäldegalerie, Berlin

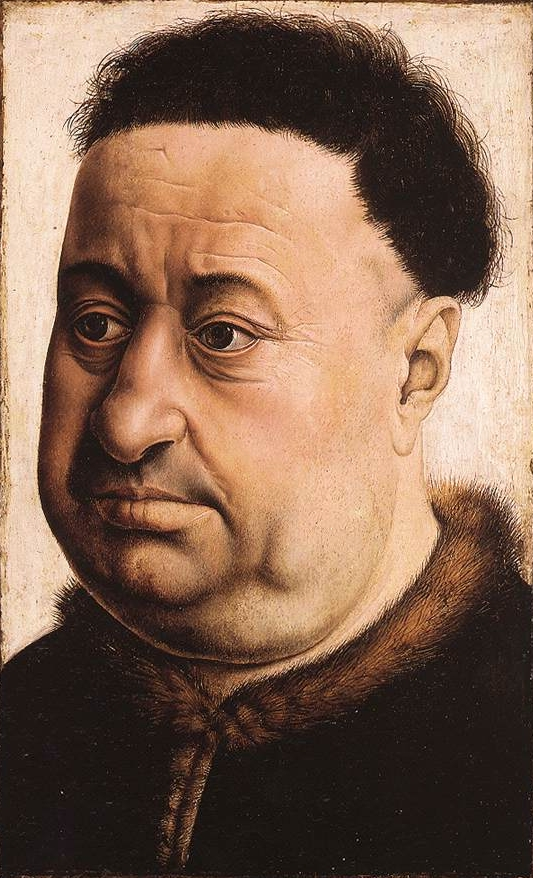
Version in the Museo Thyssen-Bornemisza

Portrait of a Fat Man (or Portrait of a Stout Man or Portrait of Robert de Masmines) are names given to two near-identical oil on panel paintings attributed to the Early Netherlandish artist Robert Campin. Both versions are dated c. 1425 and are in the Gemäldegalerie, Berlin and Museo Thyssen-Bornemisza, Madrid.

The Madrid panel was in a Belgian private collection and not widely known until 1957. The panels were first exhibited alongside each other at the National Gallery, London, in 1961. The panels are considered of equal quality and by the same hand, i.e. one is not a workshop copy of the other. However, the existence of two near-identical paintings from such an early and renowned master has excited art historians as to their commission, dating, and provenance.

The portraits are renowned for their close and realistic observation of the subject's features. They lack any attempt at flattery or idealisation; instead, the sitter is depicted as he probably was: overweight, with a long, straight nose and pronounced nostrils and a "fleshy, unbecoming gaze". However, the portrait cannot be viewed as satire, mocking or judgmental. The man has an alert appearance and intelligent, reasoned eyes, and the close cropping against a light coloured background seems deliberate, probably intended to convey the weight of his personal presence and charisma.

The sitter's identification as Robert de Masmines (c. 1387–1430/1), a Burgundian knight and governor of the County of Hainaut, was suggested by Georges Hulin de Loo, based on the man's similarity to a named portrait attributed to Jacques Leboucz from the 16th-century Recueil d'Arras manuscript. However, this theory is neither conclusive nor widely accepted.

== Sources ==
- Connolly, Anthony. Painting Portraits. Crowood, 2012.
- Kemperdick, Stephan. The Early Portraits. Munich: Prestel, 2006. ISBN 3-7913-3598-7
