= Museum of Oriental Art (Turin) =

Museum in Turin, Italy

- Museo d'Arte Orientale
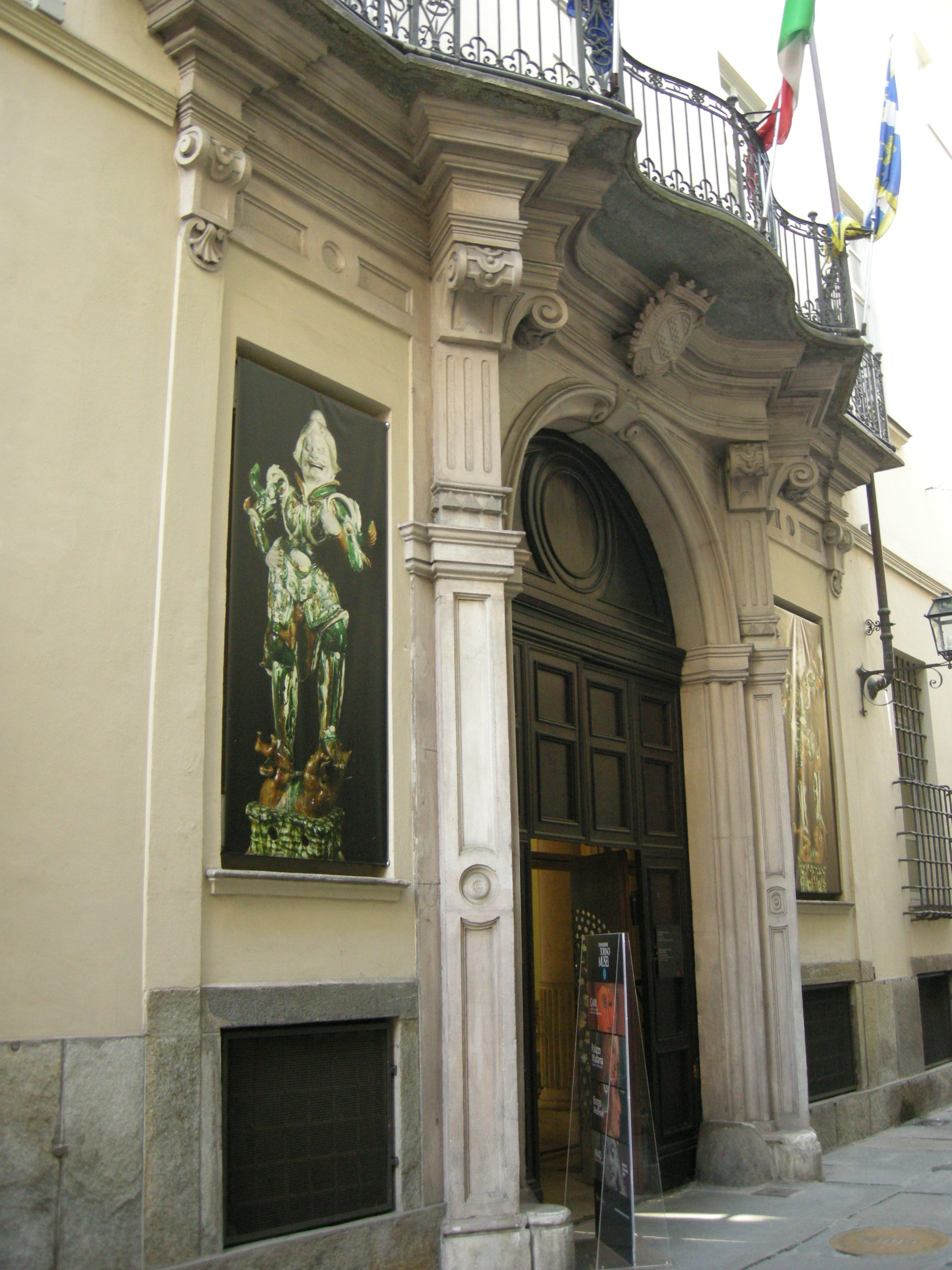

- Location within Turin
- Established: December 5, 2008
- Location: Palazzo Mazzonis, Via San Domenico 9-11, 10122 - Turin, Italy
- Coordinates: 45.0744°N 7.6794°E
- Type: Asian art and Archaeology
- Collection size: 2,300
- Visitors: 119,000 (2019)
- Director: Marco Guglielminotti Trivel
- Website: www.maotorino.it

The Museum of Oriental Art (Italian: Museo d'Arte Orientale, MAO) is a museum located in a 17th-century palazzo in the city of Turin, Italy.

The museum contains one of the most important collections of Asian art in Italy. The collection of some 2,200 works represents cultural and artistic traditions from across the Asian continent.

== History ==
The museum opened on December 5, 2008, with the merger of the Asian collection of the Turin City Museum of Ancient Art at the Palazzo Madama and contributions from Turin City Hall, the Region of Piedmont, the Fondazione Giovanni Agnelli and Compagnia di San Paolo. Architect Andrea Bruno oversaw the restoration of the Palazzo Mazzonis to house the newly formed museum.

== Collection ==
Two Japanese rock gardens are located in a courtyard on the ground floor, as well as space for temporary exhibitions.

The first floor includes collections from Pakistan, ancient Gandhara, and Southeast Asia. The collections of Chinese art (including neolithic China, ritual bronzes, lacquers and funerary art from the Han to Tang dynasties) are located on the first floor. The mezzanine between the first and second floors contains Japanese works (mainly statues, paintings, and lacquers). The Himalayan gallery is located on the third floor and dedicated to Buddhist art from Bhutan, Nepal, and Tibet. The fourth floor houses collections from Islamic countries, including Turkey, Iran, Iraq, and the Arabian Peninsula (mainly bronzes, ceramics, and tiles). In addition to these collections, which consist of about 2,300 works, there are more than 1,400 archeological finds that date back to the pre-Islamic period from the Iraqi excavations of Seleucia and Coche.
