= Turin–Milan Hours =

Illuminated manuscript

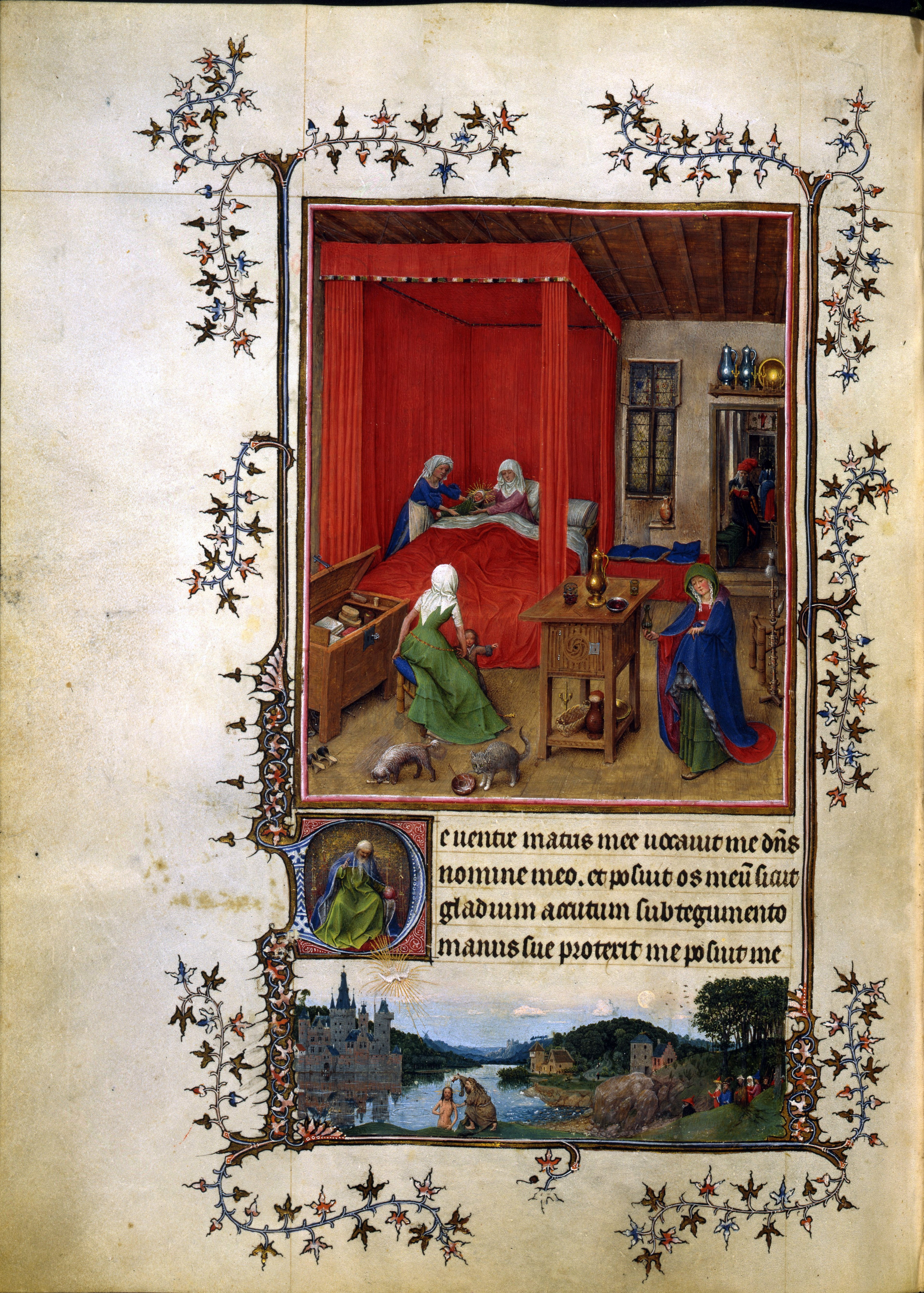
The Birth of John the Baptist (above) and the Baptism of Christ below, by "Hand G", Turin

The Turin–Milan Hours (or Milan–Turin hours, Turin Hours etc.) is a partially destroyed illuminated manuscript, which despite its name is not strictly a book of hours. It is of exceptional quality and importance, with a very complicated history both during and after its production. It contains several miniatures of about 1420 attributed to an artist known as "Hand G" who was probably either Jan van Eyck, his brother Hubert van Eyck, or an artist very closely associated with them. About a decade or so later Barthélemy d'Eyck may have worked on some miniatures. Of the several portions of the book, that kept in Turin was destroyed in a fire in 1904, though black-and-white photographs exist.

Work on the manuscript began around 1380 or 1390, and over the course of almost sixty years involved a variety of artists, assistants and patrons during perhaps seven separate campaigns of work. Its conception and first leaves were commissioned by a high-ranking member of the French court whose identity is now lost, and involved mainly French artists. Before 1413 it was in the possession of Jean, Duc de Berry; by 1420 in that of John of Bavaria, Count of Holland, who contracted mostly Flemish artists.

The early leaves are highly decorative and ornate and completed within International Gothic traditions, with stylized backgrounds but comparatively flat depth of field. The pages thought to have been compiled from the mid-1410s show particular skill in portraying perspective, especially those attributed to Hand G.

== History ==
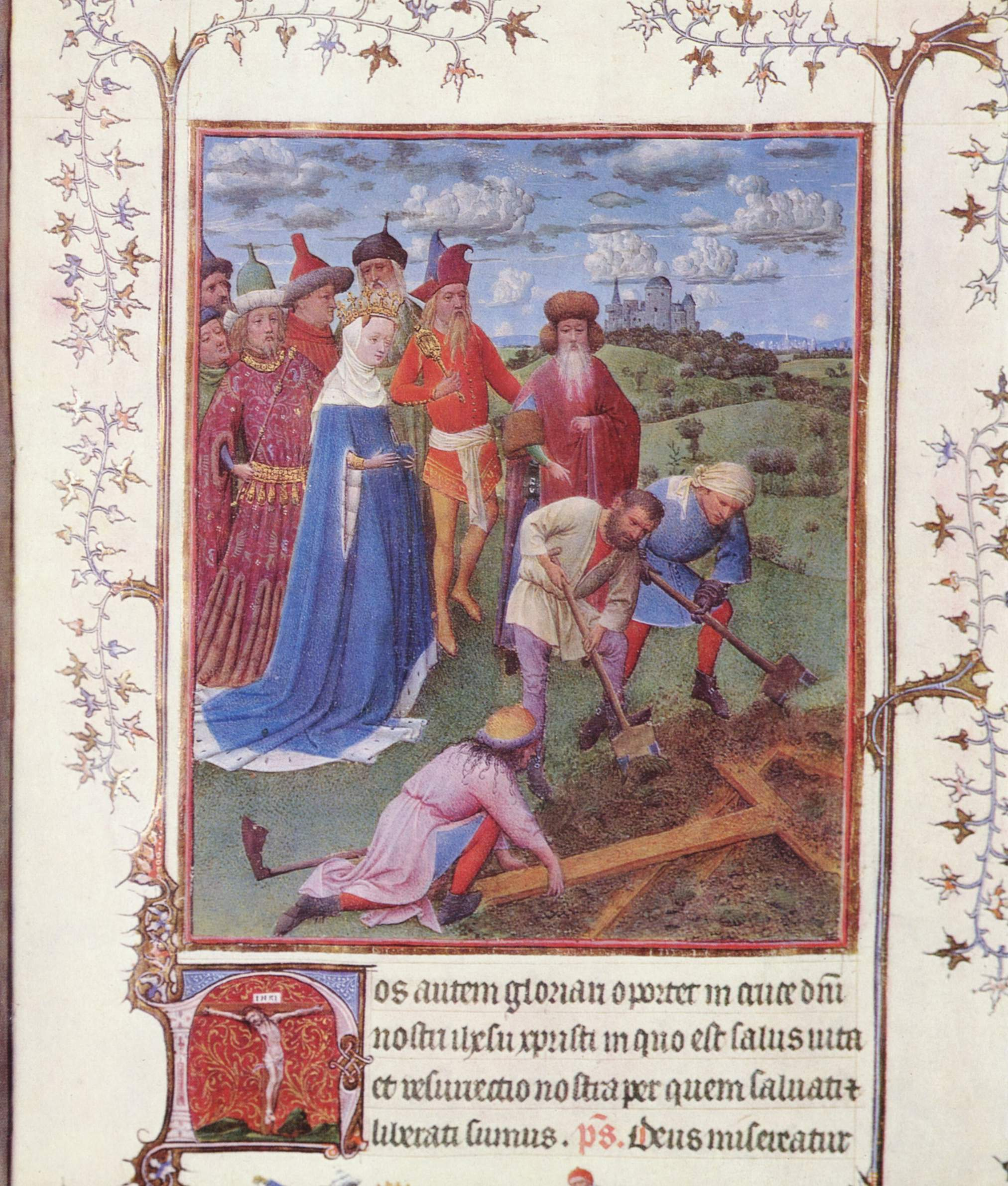
The Finding of the True Cross probably by Hand G, Turin

The work was commissioned in about 1380 or 1390, perhaps by the person who later owned it, Jean, Duc de Berry, brother of Charles V of France, and the leading commissioner of illuminated manuscripts of the day. The original commissioner was certainly a great person of the French court – Louis II, Duke of Bourbon, uncle of the King and Berry, has also been suggested. It seems to have been conceived, very unusually, as a combined book of hours, prayer-book and missal, all parts to be lavishly illustrated. The first artist involved was the leading master of the period known as the Master of the Narbonne Parement. There was another campaign by other artists in about 1405, by which time the manuscript was probably owned by the Duke of Berry, who had certainly acquired it by 1413, when the work, still very incomplete, was given to the Duke's treasurer, Robinet d'Estampes, who divided it. D'Estampes retained most of the actual book of hours, whose illustrations were largely complete, which became known as the Très Belles Heures de Notre-Dame. This remained in his family until the 18th century, and was finally given to the BnF in Paris (MS: Nouvelle acquisition latine 3093) by the Rothschild family in 1956, after they had owned it for nearly a century. This section contains 126 folios with 25 miniatures, the latest perhaps of about 1409, and includes work by the Limbourg brothers.

Robinet d'Estampes appears to have sold the other sections, with completed text but few illustrations other than the borders, and by 1420 these were owned by John, Count of Holland, or a member of his family, who commissioned a new generation of Netherlandish artists to resume work. It is the miniatures of this phase that are of the greatest interest. Two further campaigns, or phases of decoration, can be seen, the last work being of near the mid-century. The art historian Georges Hulin de Loo distinguished the work of eleven artists – "Hand A" to "Hand K" – in the work. By this stage the manuscript appears to have been owned by, or at least was at the court of, Philip the Good, Duke of Burgundy – another argument for the involvement of Jan van Eyck who moved from the employment of the counts of Holland to the court of Burgundy, apparently taking the work with him.

Most of this part of the work, the prayer-book section, known as the Turin Hours, belonged by 1479 to the House of Savoy, later kings of Sardinia (and subsequently Italy), who gave it in 1720 to the National Library in Turin. Like many other manuscripts it was destroyed, or virtually so, in a fire in 1904. This portion contained 93 leaves with 40 miniatures. However the missal portion of the work, known as the Milan Hours, was bought in Paris in 1800 by an Italian princely collector. After the fire, this part, containing 126 leaves with 28 miniatures, was also acquired by Turin in 1935, and is in the Civic Museum there (MS 47). Eight leaves had been removed from the original Turin portion, probably in the 17th century, of which four, with five miniatures, are in the Louvre. Four of the five large miniatures are by the earlier French artists, with one from the later Flemish phases (RF 2022–2025). A single leaf with miniatures from the last phase of decoration was bought by the Getty Museum in 2000, reputedly for a million US dollars, having been in a Belgian private collection.

== The miniatures and borders ==
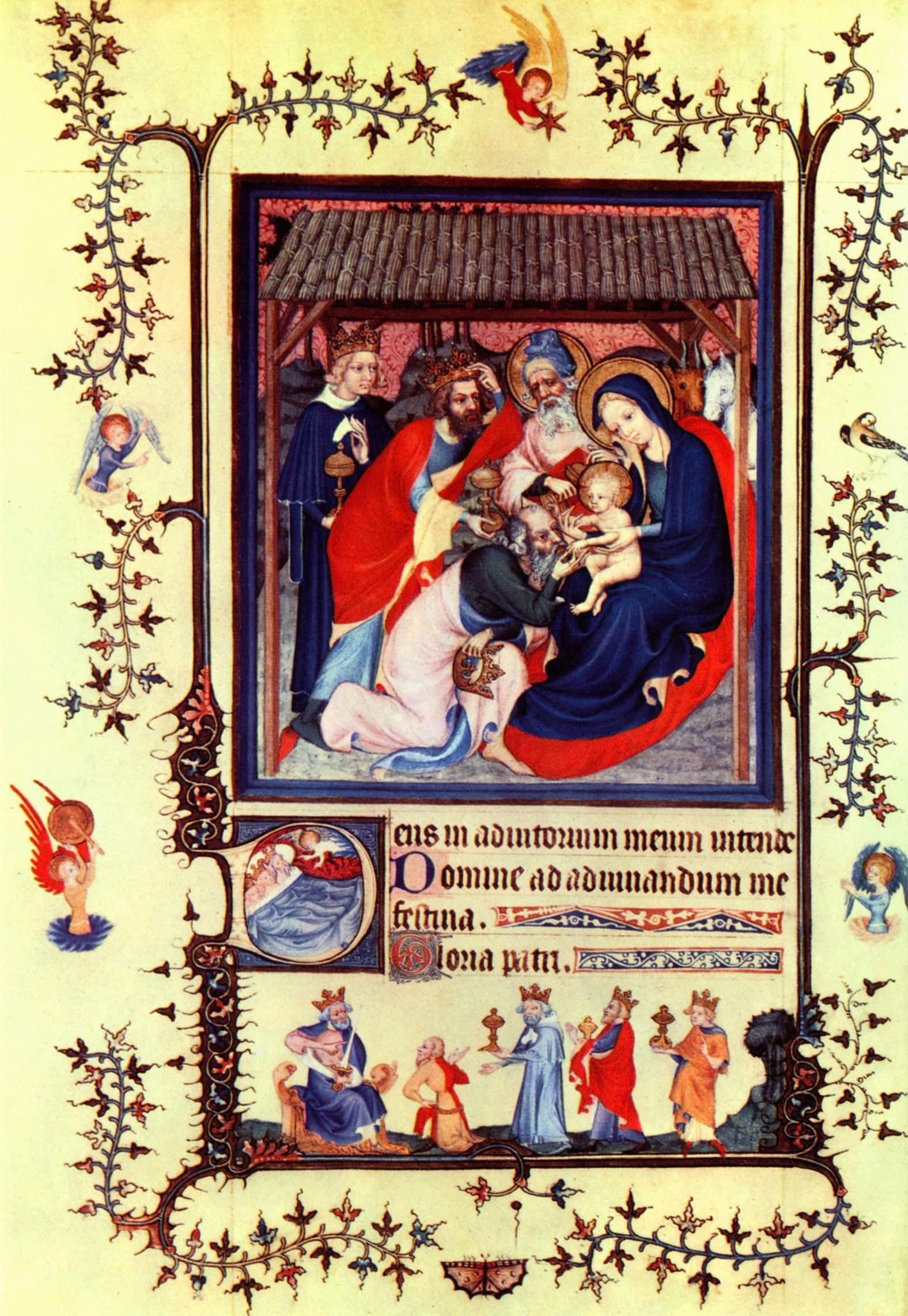
Page from the French phase of work in the Paris Très Belles Heures by the Master of the Parement or his workshop. The borders have had small images added by the miniaturist

The page size is about 284 x 203 mm. Nearly all the pages illustrated with miniatures have the same format, with a main picture above four lines of text and a narrow bas-de-page ("foot of the page") image below. Most miniatures mark the beginning of a section of text, and the initial is a decorated or historiated square. Often the bas de page image shows a scene of contemporary life related in some way to the main devotional image, or an Old Testament subject. The borders, with one exception, all follow the same relatively simple design of stylised foliage, typical of the period when the work was started, and are largely or completely from the first phase of decoration in the 14th century. These would have been done by less senior artists in the workshop, or even sub- contracted out. During the earlier campaigns, the borders are further decorated by the miniaturists with small angels, animals (mostly birds), and figures, but the later artists usually did not add these.

The single exception to the style of the borders is a destroyed page, with the main miniature a Virgo inter virgines by Hand H. The border here is in a richer and later 15th century style, from 1430 at the earliest, partly overpainting a normal border, which has also been partly scraped off. This is probably because the original border contained a portrait of a previous owner, of which traces can be seen.

The Paris Très Belles Heures probably originally contained 31 instead of the current 25 illustrated pages, which when added to 40 in the original Turin portion, 28 in the Milan-Turin portion, 5 in the Louvre and 1 in Malibu, gives a total of at least 105 illustrated pages, a very large number, approaching the 131 illustrated pages of the Très Riches Heures du Duc de Berry, which also took many decades to complete.

== The artists ==
The French art historian Paul Durrieu fortunately published his monograph, with photographs, on the Turin Hours in 1902, two years before it was burnt. He was the first to recognise that the Turin and Milan Hours were from the same volume, and to connect them with the van Eyck brothers. Georges Hulin de Loo, in his work on the Milan portion published in 1911 (by which time the Turin portion was already lost), made a division of the artists into "Hands" A–K in what he thought was their chronological sequence. This has been broadly accepted – as regards the lost Turin portion few have been in a position to dispute it – but attribution has been the subject of great debate, and Hand J in particular is now sub-divided by many. Hands A–E are French, from before the division of the work, Hands G–K are Netherlandish from after it, and Hand F has been attributed to both groups.

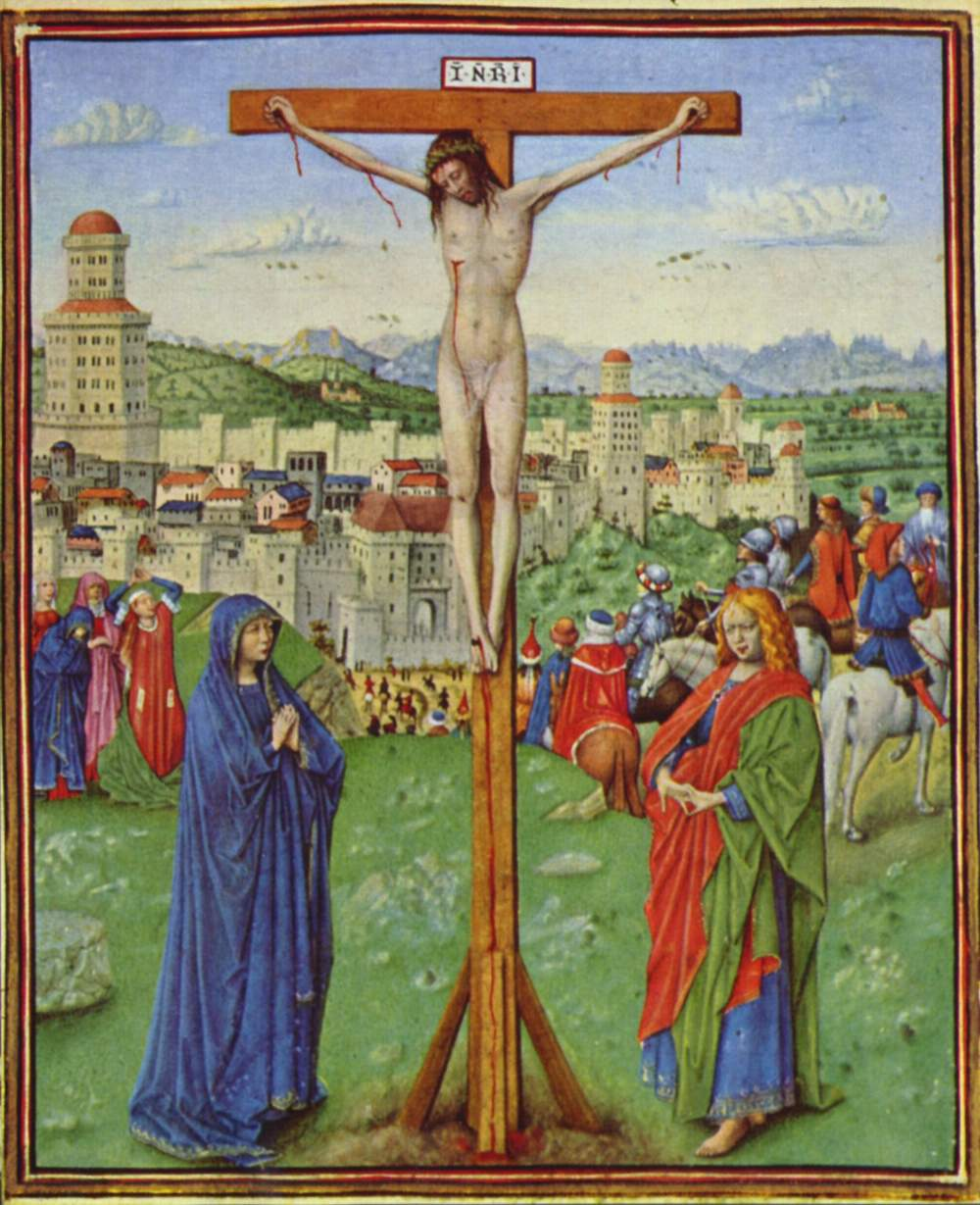
Miniature of the crucifixion by Hand H, Turin

The dating of the Hand G miniatures has been placed at various points between 1417 and the late 1430s. The pages attributed to him are universally agreed to be the most innovative; Hulin de Loos described these miniatures as "the most marvelous that had ever decorated a book, and, for their time the most stupefying known to the history of art. For the first time we see realized, in all of its consequences, the modern conception of painting... For the first time since antiquity, painting recovers the mastery of space and light" Hulin de Loos thought these the work of Hubert van Eyck, who, like most art historians of the time, he also believed to be the main artist of the Ghent Altarpiece. He thought the less exciting, but similar, Hand H might be Jan van Eyck. Since then art historical opinion has shifted to see both Hand G and most of the Ghent Altarpiece as the work of Jan; Max J. Friedländer, Anne van Buren and Albert Châtelet were among the proponents of this view. More recently, some art historians see Hand G as a different but related artist, in some ways even more innovative than the famous brothers. Proponents of this view highlight the many close compositional, iconographical and typographical similarities to van Eyck's panel paintings of the 1430s.

The pages attributed to Hand H include the Agony in the Garden, Way to Calvary and Crucifixion. They are usually dated after 1416–1417, typically 1422–1424, based on their style and on possible identifications of the donors. Hulin de Loo considered them van Eyck's "juvenilia"; Friedländer and Panofsky associated them with the workshop of van Eyck. Although the leaves are not as refined and do not evince the same technical ability as those of Hand G, they contain realistic and unflinching depictions of human distress and a number of iconographic and stylistic innovations that suggest they are copies of prototypes by Jan. Charles Sterling notes similarities between Hand H and passages in the New York Crucifixion and Last Judgement diptych miniature, a work for which completion dates as wide as 1420–1438 have been suggested, and which is known to have been finished by members of Jan's workshop. He notes the influence on van Eyck's successor in Bruges, Petrus Christus, who is known to have served as a journeyman in Jan's studio from the early 1430s. He suggests that the Agony in the Garden in particular was influential on painters in the 1430s, especially on southern German painters such as Hans Multscher and Lodewijck Allynckbrood who produced a number of works clearly indebted to Hand H.

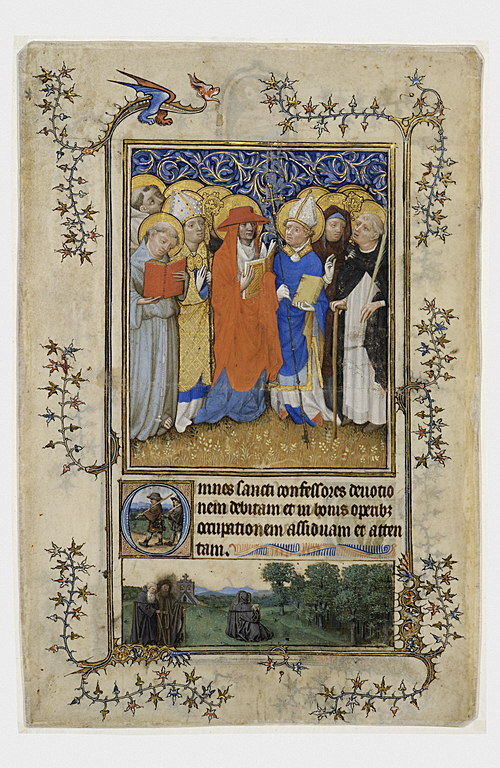
Eyckian landscape in the bas-de-page, below Gothic saints.

Hands I–K are all working in a similar Eyckian style, perhaps following underdrawing or sketches by Hand G, and are usually seen as members of Jan's workshop, although many now think work continued after Jan's death, which was by 1441 (Hubert had died in 1426). Many iconographical, as well as stylistic correspondences have been noted with other manuscripts and painting produced in Bruges from the 1430s on, and it seems clear that the manuscript was located there at this time. Numerous suggestions have been made as to their identities, mostly as anonymous illuminators named after a particular work. Hand K is the latest and generally the weakest of the later group, working up to about 1450, and "probably painting outside the workshop environment"; he is often identified as, or linked with, the Master of the Llangattock Hours.

Often the bas-de-page and main miniature are by different artists, as in the Getty's leaf, and also the borders and historiated initials.

== The style and identity of Hand G ==
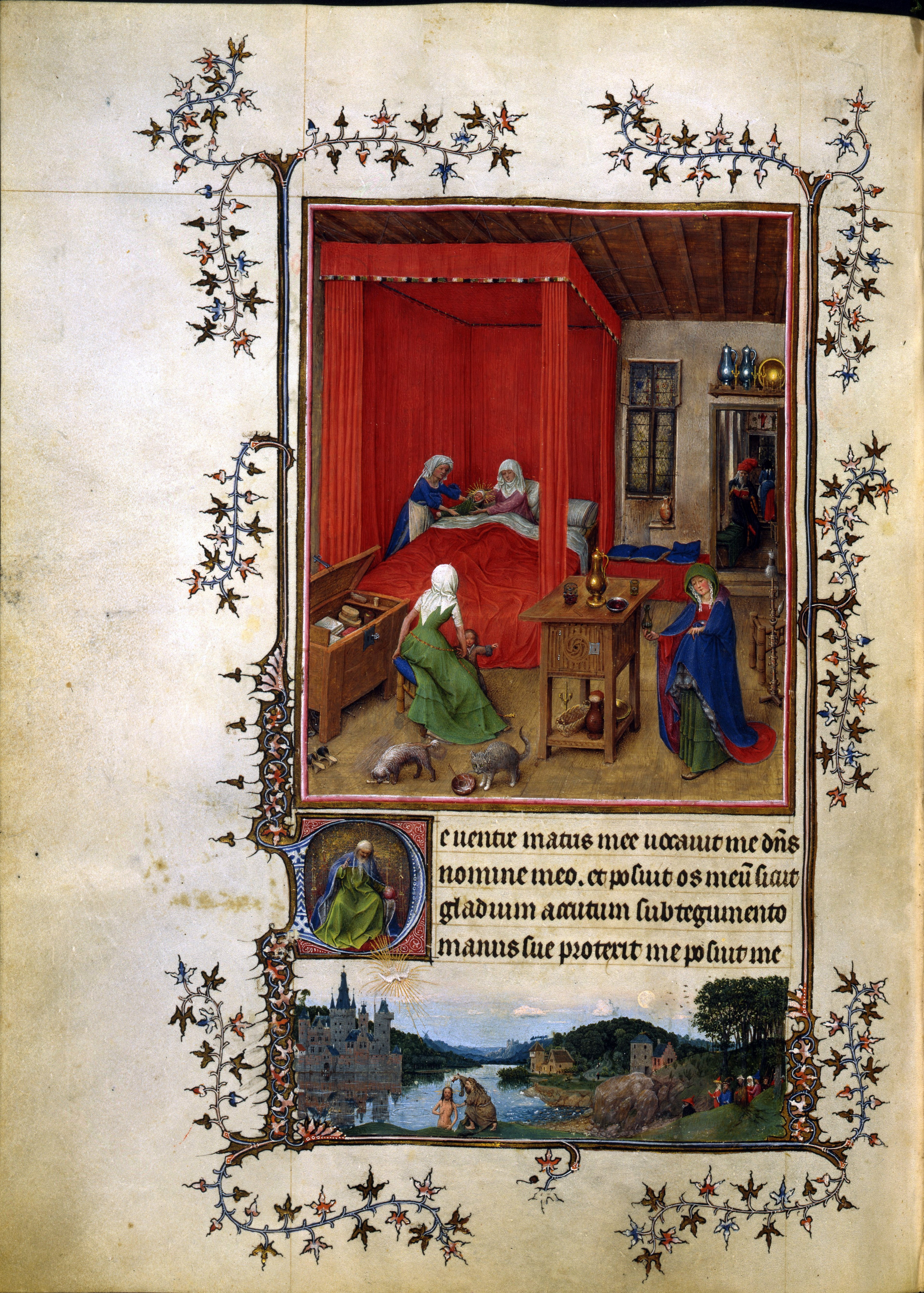
John the Baptist page. Birth of the Baptist above; bas-de-page of the Baptism of Christ, Hand G, Turin. Milan Filio 93v, Inv 47. Click for high-res image.

Hand G, who may or may not have been Jan van Eyck, paralleled the achievement and innovation of that artist's panel paintings in the miniature form, firstly in the technical development of the tempera medium and use of glazes to achieve unprecedented detail and subtlety, and also in his illusionist realism, especially seen in interiors and landscapes – the John the Baptist page shows both well. Many of the background portions of the attributed leaves seem concerned with the depiction of receding space, and it is often thought that in this aspect that the work of Hand G is most innovative. However, from the earlier pages he seems to be grappling with the techniques for the first time. He was successful early on in showing space receding over reflective water or within interior spaces, but appears to have experienced more difficulty with landscape. Early attempts, for example Christ in the Garden of Gethsemane in which three imposing figures in the foreground are presented before a distant hillscape, see him, perhaps crudely, eliminating the mid-ground to create the illusion of distance. Yet the underdrawing show him already experimenting with more effective and innovative techniques he was later to master, such as lowering the line of the horizon, and using radiating verticals to increase the sense of depth.

Only three pages at most attributed to Hand G now survive, those with large miniatures of the Birth of John the Baptist, the Finding of the True Cross – not accepted by all – (both shown above), and the Office of the Dead (or Requiem Mass), with the bas-de-page miniatures and initials of the first and last of these. Four more were lost in 1904: all the elements of the pages with the miniatures called The Prayer on the Shore (or Duke William of Bavaria at the Seashore, the Sovereign's prayer etc.), and the night-scene of the Betrayal of Christ (which was already described by Durrieu as "worn" before the fire), the Coronation of the Virgin and its bas-de-page, and the large picture only of the seascape Voyage of St Julian & St Martha. Examination under infra-red light has shown underdrawing for a different composition in the Birth of John the Baptist, who was the patron saint of John, Count of Holland. The unique and enigmatic seashore subject seems to illustrate an episode from the ferocious internal politics of the family, who can be clearly identified by the arms on a banner. Châtelet suggests the Peace of Woodrichem in 1419, when John succeeded in wresting control of her inheritance from his unlucky niece Jacqueline, Countess of Hainaut. The bas-de-page shows another landscape, of flat Dutch countryside, looking forward to the Dutch Golden Age painting of the 17th century.

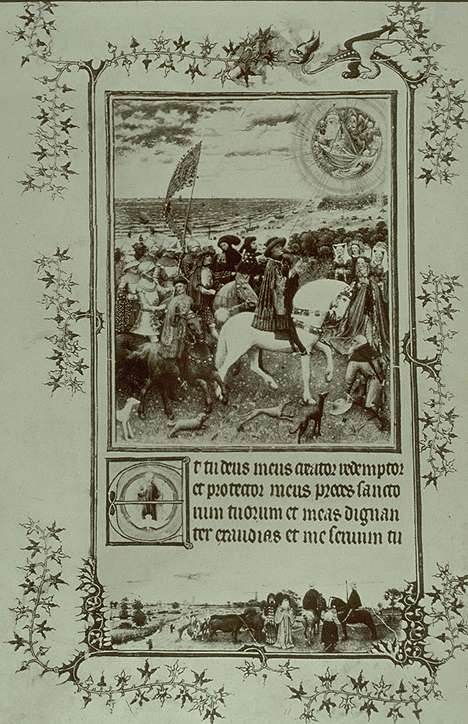
The Prayer on the Shore by Hand G, destroyed in 1904

Châtelet contrasts the Turin miniatures with those of the Limbourg brothers, which show faces in profile, with the clothes barely modeled onto the bodies, and the figures not integrated into the space of the miniature. In the Hand G images the figures are fully modelled, as are their clothes, shown from a variety of angles, and are rather small, not dominating the space of their setting. Chiaroscuro modelling gives depth and realism to both figures and setting. For Friedlaender "The local colours are adjusted to the dominant tone with inexplicable confidence. The gliding of shadows, the rippling of waves, the reflection in the water, cloud formations: all that is most evanescent and most delicate is expressed with easy mastery. A realism that the entire century failed to reach seems to have been achieved once by the impetus of the first attack".

Kenneth Clark, who thought Hand G to be Hubert, agreed: "Hubert van Eyck has, at one bound, covered a space in the history of art which the prudent historian would have expected to last over several centuries", and singled out praise for the innovations in the subtle depictions of landscape. Of the seashore scene he says: "The figures in the foreground are in the chivalric style of the de Limbourgs; but the sea shore beyond them is completely outside the fifteenth-century range of responsiveness, and we see nothing like it again until Jacob van Ruisdael's beach-scenes of the mid-seventeenth century." Marine art historian Margarita Russell, describes the Hand G marine scenes as "capturing the first true vision of pure seascape" in art. Some (but not all) of the miniatures in the Limbourg brothers' especially ornate Très Riches Heures du Duc de Berry, which is contemporary or slightly earlier, contain innovative depictions of reflections in water, but these are taken further in the Hand G miniatures.

As Thomas Kren points out, the earlier dates for Hand G precede any known panel painting in an Eyckian style, which "raise[s] provocative questions about the role that manuscript illumination may have played in the vaunted verisimilitude of Eyckian oil painting". Otto Pächt emphasized the "spatial conflict" that affected illusionistic manuscript miniatures, sharing the page with text, in a way that did not affect panel paintings: "the necessity of having to look into the page of the book, however cleverly contrived, meant that from now on the book housed a picture as an alien body on which it no longer had any formal influence". Debate on Hand G's identity continues.

== Facsimiles ==
Facsimile editions have been published of the surviving Turin section (1994:980 copies), accompanied by a large commentary, and separately of the BnF "Très Belles Heures de Notre Dame", and of the Louvre leaves (which includes photographs of the burnt Turin pages). The 1902 volume of Durrieu has also been republished (Turin 1967), with new photographs from the original negatives, and a new introduction by Châtelet. The quality of the photos, or their reproduction, have been criticised in both editions.

Additionally, digital facsimiles exist of all sections of the manuscript.

== See also ==
- List of works by Jan van Eyck
