= Master of the Llangattock Epiphany =

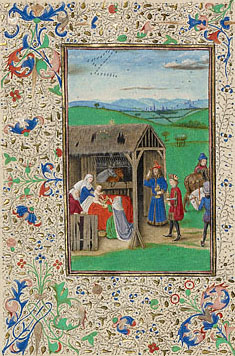
The Adoration of the Magi (1450s). Tempera colors, gold leaf, gold paint, and ink on parchment. 10 3/8 × 7 1/4 in. (dimensions of page). In the collection of the Getty Museum, Los Angeles

The Master of the Llangattock Epiphany was a Flemish manuscript painter active between 1450 and 1460. He is one of at least eight artists who contributed to a Book of Hours, the Llangattock Hours, now in the J. Paul Getty Museum collection. His name is derived from this book, whose title in turn was derived from the name of a previous owner. The Master contributed one miniature to the collection, an Adoration of the Magi; he is believed to have lived in Bruges.

The master should not be confused with the Master of the Llangattock Hours, whose work may be found in the same book.
