= Master of the Llangattock Hours =

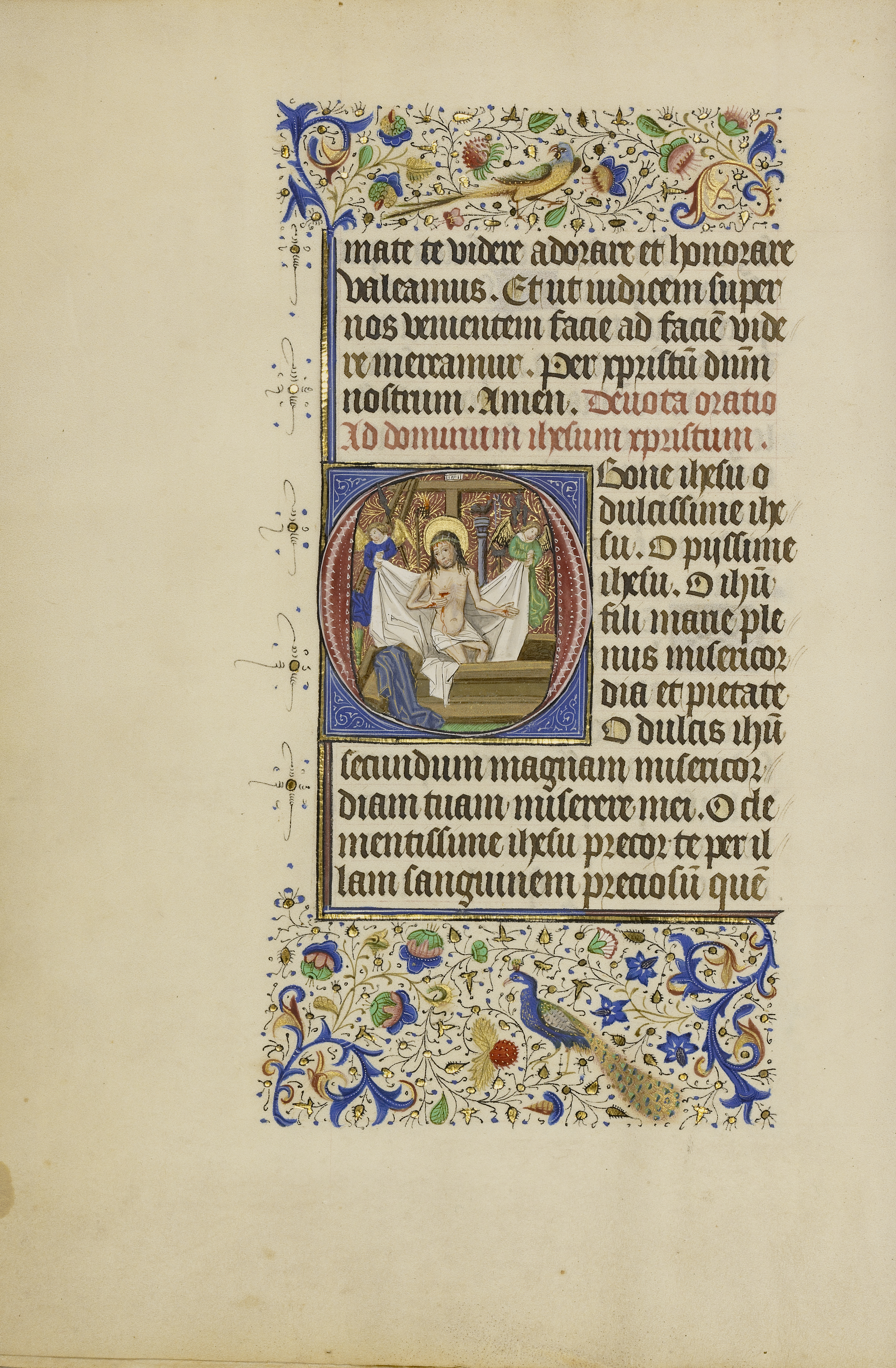
Initial O: The Man of Sorrows (1450s). Tempera colors, gold leaf, gold paint, and ink on parchment. 10 3/8 × 7 1/4 in. (dimensions of page). In the collection of the Getty Museum, Los Angeles

The Master of the Llangattock Hours was a Flemish manuscript painter active between 1450 and 1460. He is one of at least eight artists who contributed to the Llangattock Hours, a book of hours now in the J. Paul Getty Museum collection; his name is derived from the fact that he appears to have been the primary artist, and was assigned in turn after the name of a previous owner of the book. He was active in the generation after Jan van Eyck and shows a great deal of his influence, at times directly copying the elder master's compositions. Nevertheless, his figures are small and stiff, set in landscapes or in awkwardly-drawn architectural settings. His color schemes are dense, with little indication of an understanding of lighting techniques. It is believed that the Master lived and worked in Bruges, given his reliance on the work of earlier local masters, his work on the Turin-Milan Hours, and collaboration with other local painters, such as Willem Vrelant.

The Master should not be confused with the Master of the Llangattock Epiphany, whose work may also be found in the same book, which once belonged to John Rolls, 2nd Baron Llangattock, older brother of Charles Rolls, co-founder of Rolls-Royce.
