= Auguste de Bastard d'Estang =

Jean-François-Auguste, comte de Bastard d'Estang (11 December 1792 - 16 April 1883) was a French army officer, art historian, art collector and publisher. His son Octave also followed a military career.

== Life ==
=== Military career ===
Born in Nogaro, he was brother to Dominique-François-Marie de Bastard d'Estang and like him joined the army, becoming sub-lieutenant in the 2nd Cuirassier Regiment. He was wounded at the Battle of Leipzig and captured. After the Bourbon Restoration he became a cavalry captain in the 1st company of the King's Musketeers in 1814 and then in the Royal Guard in 1816, taking part in the defence of the Tuileries during the Trois Glorieuses and retiring on Charles X's fall from power. He later rejoined the army as aide de camp to maréchal Oudinot and was promoted to chef d'escadron on the general staff in 1837. He was attached to the historical section of the Dépôt général de la guerre on 16 August 1848 and retired for the second time the following year.

=== Arts ===
He was made a member of the Historic Committee for Monuments and the Arts on 18 December 1837. Fascinated by medieval history and art, he collected artworks, books, seals, charters, artworks and illuminated manuscripts. In 1835 he was given a patent to work as a lithographic printer and devoted himself to reproducing medieval illuminated manuscripts in that medium. He set up a studio in his hôtel particulier in Paris and employed thirty artists and craftsmen to produce very high quality facsimiles such as Librairie du duc de Berry, Histoire de Jésus-Christ en figures and Costumes, mœurs et usages de la cour de Bourgogne.

His most notable series came out between 1835 and 1869, entitled Peintures et ornements des manuscrits, classés dans un ordre chronologique, pour servir à l'histoire des arts du dessin, depuis le IV siecle de l'ère chrétienne jusqu'au XVI siecle, covering manuscripts from the 4th to 16th centuries. The quality of its reproductions was unprecedented - each plate was hand-painted on special paper designed by Canson, with gold and platine reliefs. It cost over hundred times more than black lithographs and these plates were presented at the Great Exhibition in London in 1851 and the Exposition Universelle in Paris in 1878.

To finance this expensive enterprise, Bastard d'Estang gained subscriptions from François Guizot, minister for public education, and Adolphe Thiers, interior minister, as part of a policy to encourage study of the Middle Ages. In all, from 1834 until Bastard d'Estang's death, the series received almost a million francs of public subsidy from several different French government (especially those before 1848), which repeatedly gave rise to questions in parliament, commissions of enquiry, and even litigation before the Conseil d'État. Between 1839 and 1845, d'Estand also toured the courts of Europe to raise more subscriptions.

Between 1835 and 1848 he distributed twenty deliveries, each with eight plates, with the government subscribing for sixty copies for public libraries. The Revolution of 1848 not only cancelled ministerial subscriptions but also led to a fire at Bastardd'Estang's studio, both leading to work severely slowing down. Thirty years later, a series of sixty plates were acquired by the government, completing the French edition of Peintures et ornements des manuscrits, which included 220 plates, realised in 1877 by the Imprimerie nationale, probably the most expensive book it ever produced. The copy in the precious books store of the Bibliotheque Nationale de France (BNF) has disappeared. Several foreign governments also printed editions of the work, as well as incompleted plates left to the BNF. In the end only part of what Bastardd'Estang had originally envisaged was completed, as shown by his preparatory work, manuscript notes and tracings of miniature paintings, all held at the BNF (the notes in the manuscripts department and the tracings and drawings in the prints and drawings department).

He produced high quality copies of certain illuminations from the Hortus Deliciarum, a 12th-century encyclopaedia, whose only original copy was destroyed in an 1870 fire. He died at the château de Bachac.

== Bibliography ==
- (in French) Les Collections de Bastard d'Estang à la Bibliothèque nationale. Catalogue analytique. Par Léopold Delisle... Chartes. Sceaux. Peintures et ornements des manuscrits. Recueils divers, 1885
