= Master of the Parement =

Medieval French painter

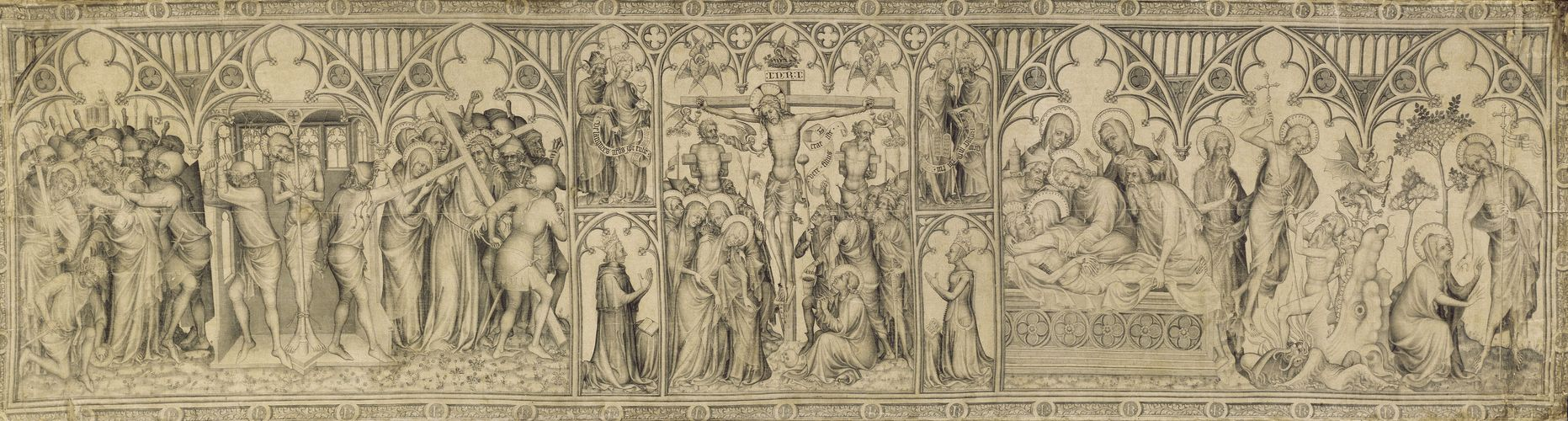
Parement of Narbonne

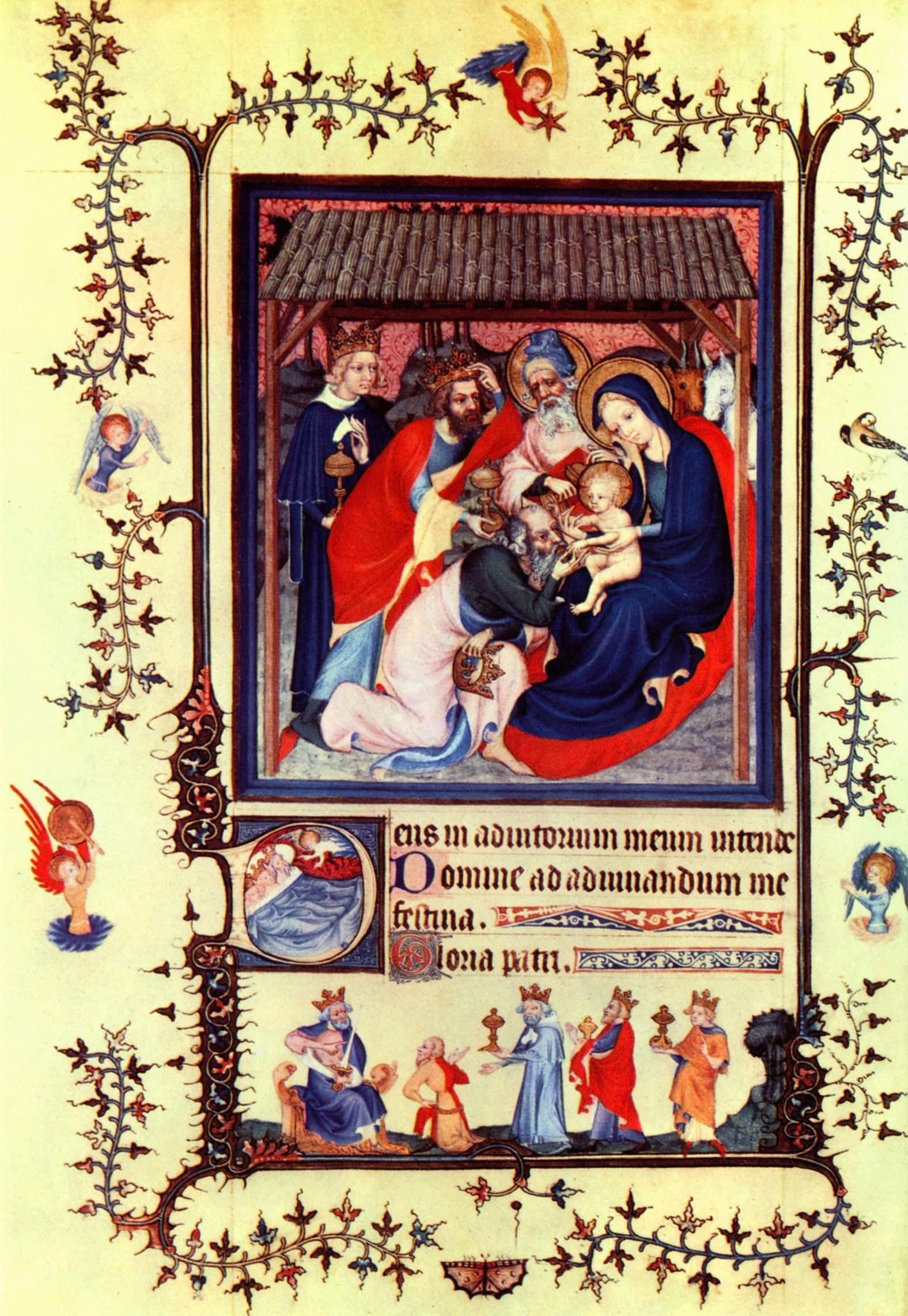
Adoration of the Magi, manuscript illumination from the Très Belles Heures de Notre Dame (BnF), by the Master of the Parement or his circle

The Master of the Parement of Narbonne, often referred to more briefly as the Master of the Parement or Parement Master is the name given to an artist of uncertain identity who flourished in France in the late 14th century and early 15th century. He belongs to the period of medieval painting sometimes referred to as International Gothic. The Master is named after the Parement de Narbonne, a unique painted silk altar frontal or parament found in the former Cathedral of Saint Just at Narbonne and now in the Louvre in Paris.

The Parement of Narbonne is 2.86 metres (9 ft 5 in) long and 77.5 centimetres (30.5 in) high, and is painted in black ink (strictly, grisaille) on silk. It includes scenes from the Passion and Resurrection of Christ, including the Kiss of Judas, the Flagellation, the Carrying of the Cross, the Entombment, the Descent into Limbo and the Noli Me Tangere. The then king of France, Charles V and his queen, Jeanne de Bourbon, are shown kneeling at either side of the cross in the central Crucifixion scene. Their presence suggests that the altarcloth was commissioned between 1364, the date of Charles's accession, and 1378 when the queen died. Its colour suggests that it was made for use during Lent, when it was conventional for richly coloured altarpieces to be covered by more simple drapes.

Some illuminated manuscripts are attributed to the same artist or his circle, including some of the illustrations in the Book of Hours of René d'Anjou which is now in the British Library, and the important manuscript, now in different parts in several museums known as the Très Belles Heures de Notre Dame (BnF), and the Milan-Turin Hours. According to the British Library, the Parement Master may have been Jean d'Orleans, an artist who is known to have been employed by Charles V between 1340 and 1407.

The style of the workshop of the Parement Master is distinctive. The figures are graceful and relatively realistic and three-dimensional in appearance, with expressive faces, but their heads tend to be disproportionate and heavy. Meiss (1967) suggests that the artists were influenced by earlier Italian painting, though others have drawn parallels with contemporary Bohemian style, or have seen northern (perhaps Flemish) influence in the realism of the faces. Both the handling of the grisaille technique and the box-like architectural frames in which some of the scenes are set indicate a keen awareness of the earlier work of Jean Pucelle (active in Paris in the 1320s).
