= Paul Durrieu =

French museum curator (1855–1925)

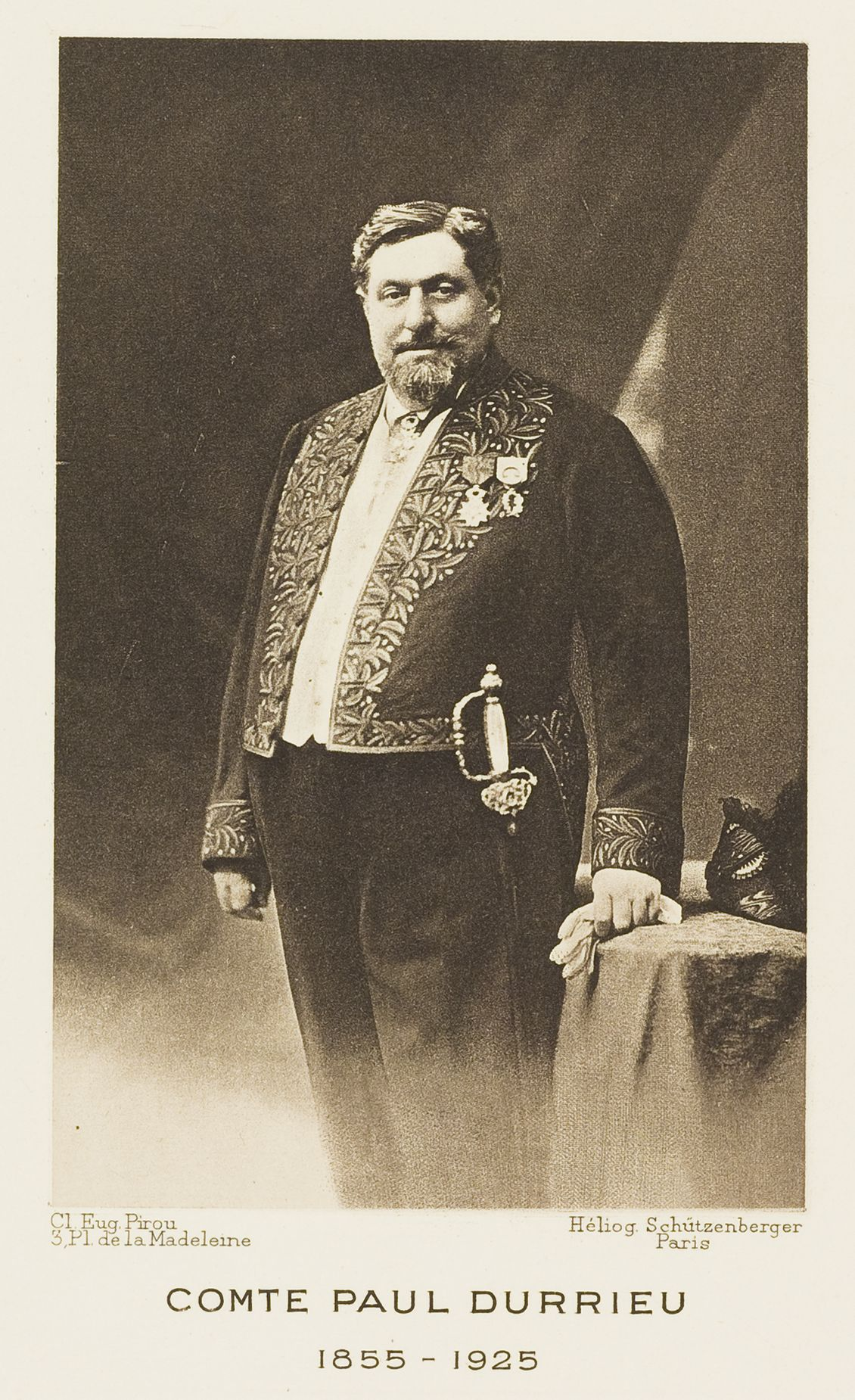
Durrieu in 1907 in an academician's uniform by Eugène Pirou.

Count Paul Durrieu (2 October 1855 - 24 November 1925) was a French museum curator and art historian.

== Life ==
=== Family ===
Born in Strasbourg, he was the son of Henri Durrieu (1822-1890), founder and first president of the crédit industriel et commercial, commander of the légion d'honneur and receiver general for Bas-Rhin, and his wife Gabrielle Lacave-Laplagne (1829-1891). Paul had an elder brother Tony (1847-1861), whilst his great-uncle Antoine Simon Durrieu won renown in the French Revolutionary Wars and Napoleonic Wars. He married Françoise Duchaussoy (1869-1949) and had four children with her Jean, Henry, Gabrielle and François.

=== Career ===
After studying at the lycée Bonaparte then the École nationale des chartes (graduating top of his class in 1878), he was made a member of the École française de Rome in 1879 then two years later as an assistant to the Louvre's paintings department in charge of illuminated manuscripts and late medieval French paintings. He was later made a curator, again in the paintings department.

His time in Rome and his Gascon family background influenced him to study the military and political links between France and Italy by organising the Angevin archives in Naples. He then devoted himself to his role at the Louvre and to the history of painting and medieval illuminated manuscripts.

He was made a Knight of the Légion d'honneur in 1903 and promoted to officer in the same order in 1921. He was elected to the académie des inscriptions et belles-lettres in 1907 and died in Rivière-Saas-et-Gourby in 1925.

== Works ==
- Les Gascons en Italie. 1885.
- Les archives angevines de Naples: Étude sur les registres du roi Charles Ier (1265-1285). 1886.
- Un Grand Enlumineur Parisien Au XVe Siècle: Jacques de Besançon et son Œuvre.
- L'Histoire du bon Roi Alexandre: Manuscrit à miniatures de la collection Dutuit.
- Les Très Riches Heures de Jean de France, duc de Berry. Plon. 1904. - first publication of that manuscript's miniatures and first detailed study of the subject
- Bernard VII, comte d'Armagnac, connétable de France - 136?-1418, Villemomble, A. de Solages, 2003 (BNF 40945250) - transcription of a thesis presented to the École de Chartes on 21 January 1878

== Bibliography (in French) ==
- Charles-Victor Langlois (1925). Éloge funèbre de M. Paul Durrieu, membre de l'Académie. Vol. 69. Paris: Académie des Inscriptions et Belles-Lettres. pp. 319–323.
- Henri-François Delaborde (1925). Le comte Paul Durrieu. Vol. 23. Journal des savants. pp. 267–269.
- Alexandre de Laborde (13 January 1928). Notice sur la vie et les travaux de M. le comte Paul Durrieu, membre de l'Académie. Vol. 72. Paris: Académie des Inscriptions et Belles-Lettres. pp. 400–435.
- Gabriel Cabannes (1934). Galerie des landais. Hossegor: Chabas. pp. 289–295.
