= Georges Hulin de Loo =

Belgian art historian

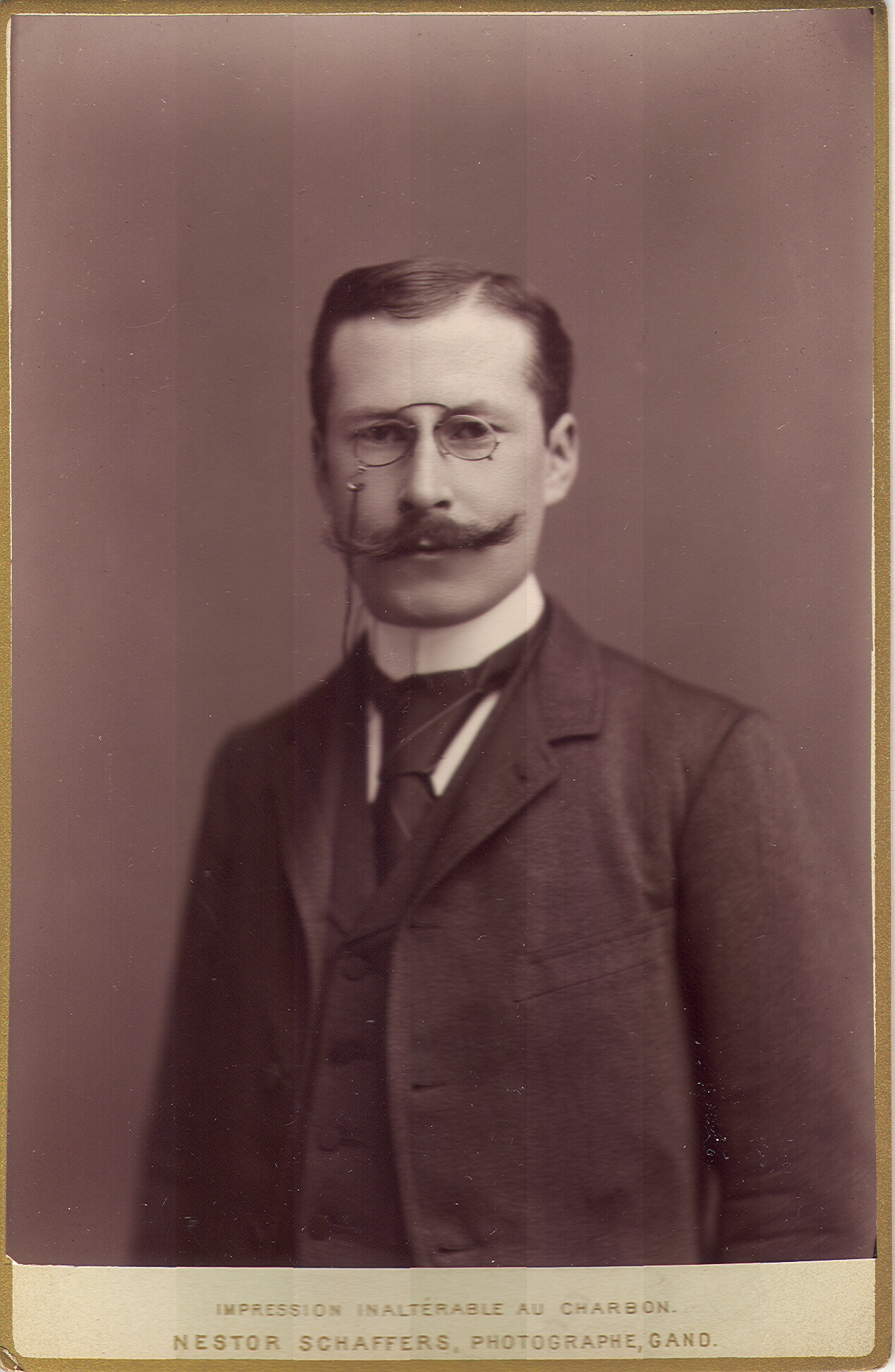
Georges Hulin de Loo

Georges Hulin de Loo (10 December 1862, in Ghent – 27 December 1945, in Brussels) was a Belgian art historian specialising in Early Netherlandish art. He was educated in his home city of Ghent where he attended high school and university, earning a Ph.D from the Faculty of Arts in 1883, and a degree in law three years later. He then traveled to Germany and Paris to continue his studies, returning to Ghent in 1889 to take up a teaching position the University of Ghent in a variety of subjects such as logic and law.

After visiting the 1902 Bruges exhibition of Netherlandish art (Exposition de tableaux flamands des XIVe, XVe et XVIe siècles) he published an independent critical catalogue with Alfons Siffer, highlighting the large number of mistakes in the official catalogue which had used attributions and descriptions from the owners. He went on to become a leading scholar in the field. He wrote a separate introduction to the catalogue in which he speculated about the painters' identities (De l’identité de certains maîtres anonymes), followed by publications about Pieter Bruegel the Elder and Jan Provoost. He was the first art historian to suggest that Robert Campin was in the fact the painter known as the Master of Flemalle and to identify Rogier van der Weyden as an apprentice to Campin.

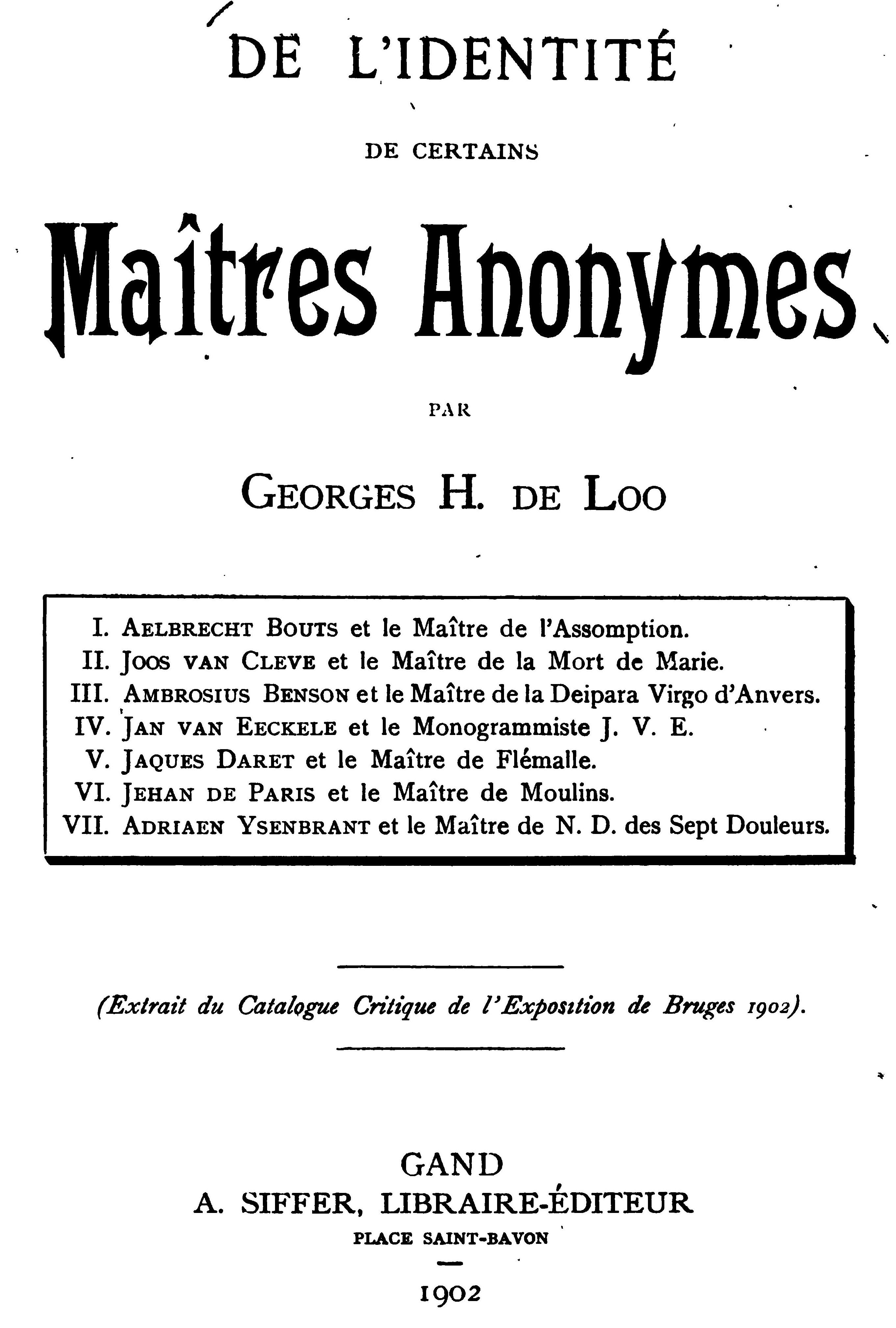
Extract of his critical catalog of the 1902 exhibition, where he makes his case for the identification of several painters.

In 1911 he studied and published a study of the Turin-Milan Hours suggesting a number of miniatures were painted by Hubert and Jan van Eyck, an assertion which continues to be a contentious issue among art historians.

Hulin became active in the art community, sat on committees and associations, and was a consulting editor to The Burlington Magazine. He continued in his teaching position at Ghent University, however, when in 1930 the university became a Flemish speaking institution, he retired soon after. He continued to write, publishing a biography of Rogier van der Weyden in 1938. Along with Max Friedländer, who also visited the 1902 Bruges exhibition and wrote a review, Hulin became a leading scholar in the field of Netherlandish art.

He died unmarried and without children in 1945.
