= Valognes (disambiguation) =

Valognes is a commune in France. Valognes may also refer to:

- de Valognes, people named de Valognes
- Canton of Valognes, administrative division in France
- Valognes station, railway station in France
- Valognes Abbey, abbey in France
- Treaty of Valognes, treaty
