= John II of France =

King of France from 1350 to 1364

John II
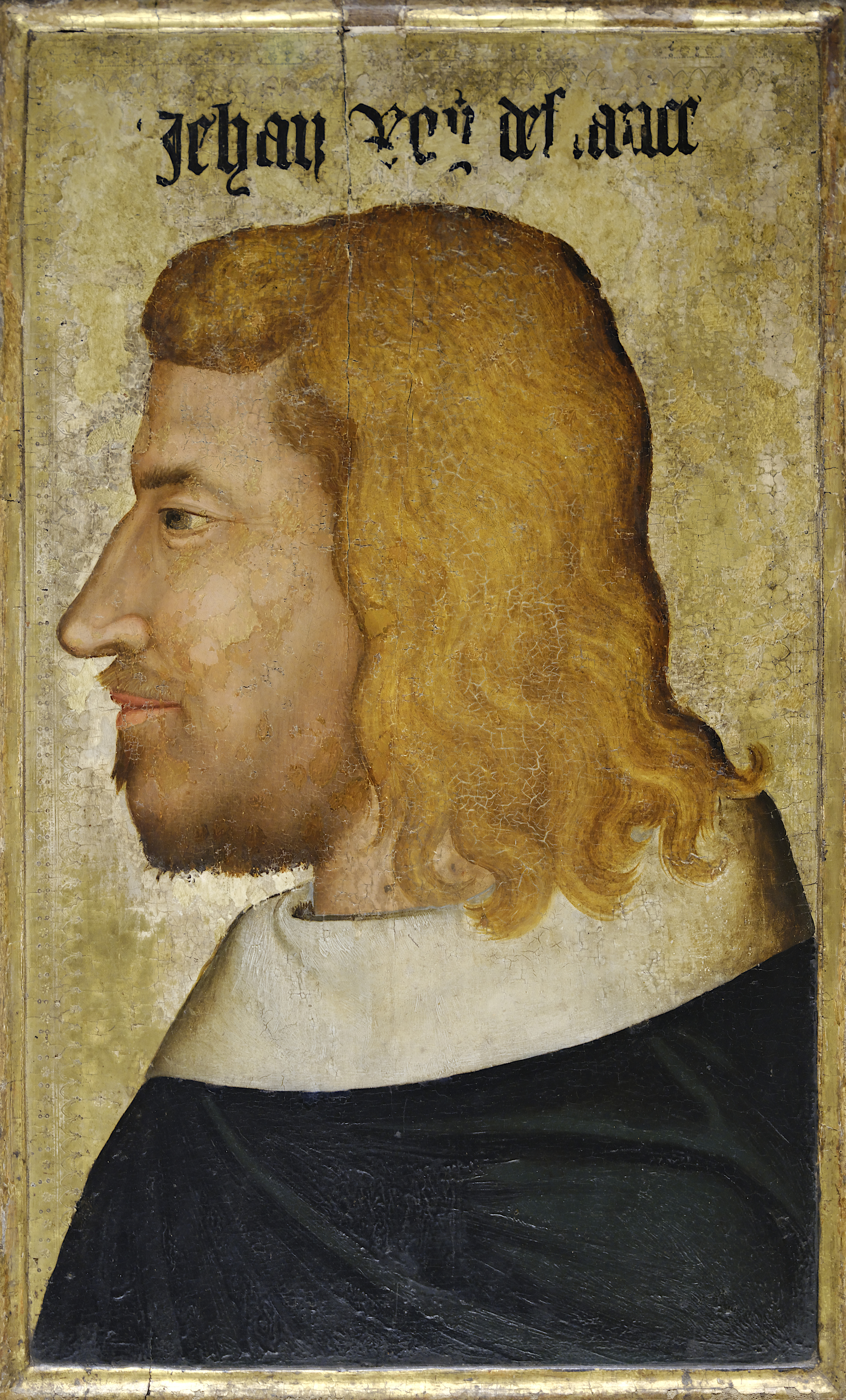
- Portrait on wood panel around 1350, Louvre Museum

King of France
- Reign: 22 August 1350 – 8 April 1364
- Coronation: 26 September 1350
- Predecessor: Philip VI
- Successor: Charles V
- Regent: Charles, Dauphin of France (1356–1360)
- Born: 26 April 1319; Le Mans, France
- Died: 8 April 1364 (aged 44); Savoy Palace, London, England
- Burial: 7 May 1364; Saint Denis Basilica
- Spouses: Bonne of Bohemia (m. 1332; died 1349) Joan I, Countess of Auvergne (m. 1350; died 1360)
- Issue: Charles V, King of France; Louis I, Duke of Anjou; John, Duke of Berry; Philip II, Duke of Burgundy; Joan, Queen of Navarre; Marie, Duchess of Bar; Isabella, Countess of Vertus
- House: Valois
- Father: Philip VI of France
- Mother: Joan of Burgundy

John II (French: Jean II; 26 April 1319 – 8 April 1364), called John the Good (French: Jean le Bon), was King of France from 1350 until his death in 1364. When he came to power, France faced several disasters: the Black Death, which killed between a third and a half of its population; popular revolts known as Jacqueries; free companies (Grandes Compagnies) of routiers who plundered the country; and English aggression during the Hundred Years' War that resulted in catastrophic military losses, including the Battle of Poitiers of 1356, in which John was captured.

While John was a prisoner in London, his son Charles became regent and faced several rebellions, which he overcame. To liberate his father, he concluded the Treaty of Brétigny in 1360, by which France lost many territories and paid an enormous ransom. In an exchange of hostages, which included his son Louis I, Duke of Anjou, John was released from captivity to raise funds for his ransom. Upon his return to France, he created the franc to stabilise the currency and tried to get rid of the free companies by sending them to a crusade, but Pope Innocent VI died shortly before their meeting in Avignon. When John was informed that Louis had escaped from captivity, he voluntarily returned to England, where he died in 1364. He was succeeded by his eldest son, Charles V.

== Early life ==
John was nine years old when his father, Philip VI, was crowned king. Philip VI's ascent to the throne was unexpected: all three sons of Philip IV had died without sons and their daughters were passed over. Also passed over was King Edward III of England, Philip IV's grandson through his daughter, Isabella. Thus, as the new king of France, John's father Philip VI had to consolidate his power in order to protect his throne from rival claimants; therefore, he decided to marry off his son John quickly at the age of thirteen to form a strong matrimonial alliance.

=== Search for a wife and first marriage ===
Initially a marriage with Eleanor of Woodstock, sister of King Edward III of England, was considered, but instead Philip invited King John the Blind of Bohemia to Fontainebleau. Bohemia had aspirations to control Lombardy and needed French diplomatic support. A treaty was drawn up. The military clauses stipulated that, in the event of war, Bohemia would support the French army with four hundred infantrymen. The political clauses ensured that the Lombard crown would not be disputed if the king of Bohemia managed to obtain it. Philip selected Bonne of Bohemia as a wife for his son, as she was closer to child-bearing age (16 years), and the dowry was fixed at 120,000 florins.

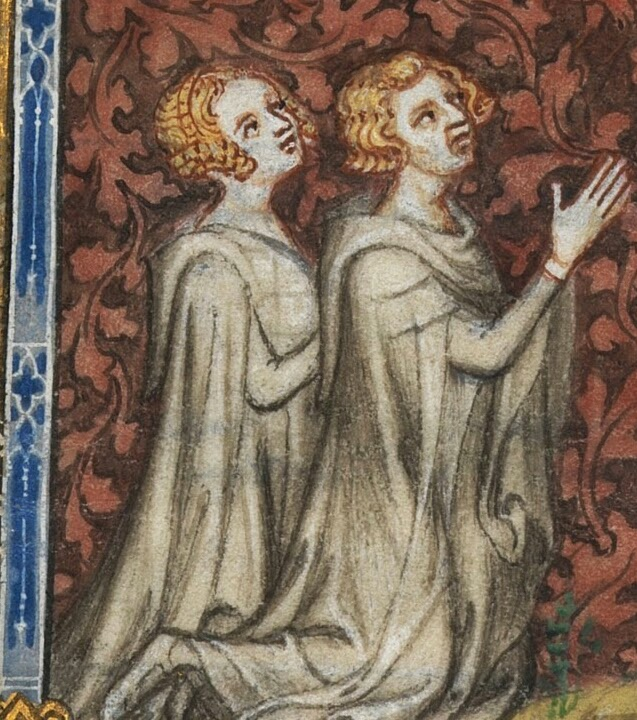
John and his first wife Bonne

John reached the age of majority, 13 years and one day, on 27 April 1332, and received the Duchy of Normandy, as well as the counties of Anjou and Maine. The wedding was celebrated on 28 July at the church of Notre-Dame in Melun in the presence of six thousand guests. The festivities were prolonged by a further two months when the young groom was finally knighted at the cathedral of Notre-Dame in Paris. As the new duke of Normandy, John was solemnly granted the arms of a knight in front of a prestigious assembly bringing together the kings of Bohemia and Navarre, and the dukes of Burgundy, Lorraine and Brabant.

== Duke of Normandy ==
=== Accession and rise of the English and the royalty ===
Upon his accession as Duke of Normandy in 1332, John had to deal with the reality that most of the Norman nobility was already allied with the English. Effectively, Normandy depended economically more on maritime trade across the English Channel than on river trade on the Seine. Although the duchy had not been in Angevin possession for 150 years, many landowners had holdings across the Channel. Consequently, to line up behind one or other sovereign risked confiscation. Therefore, Norman members of the nobility were governed as interdependent clans, which allowed them to obtain and maintain charters guaranteeing the duchy a measure of autonomy. It was split into two key camps, the counts of Tancarville and the counts of Harcourt, which had been in conflict for generations.

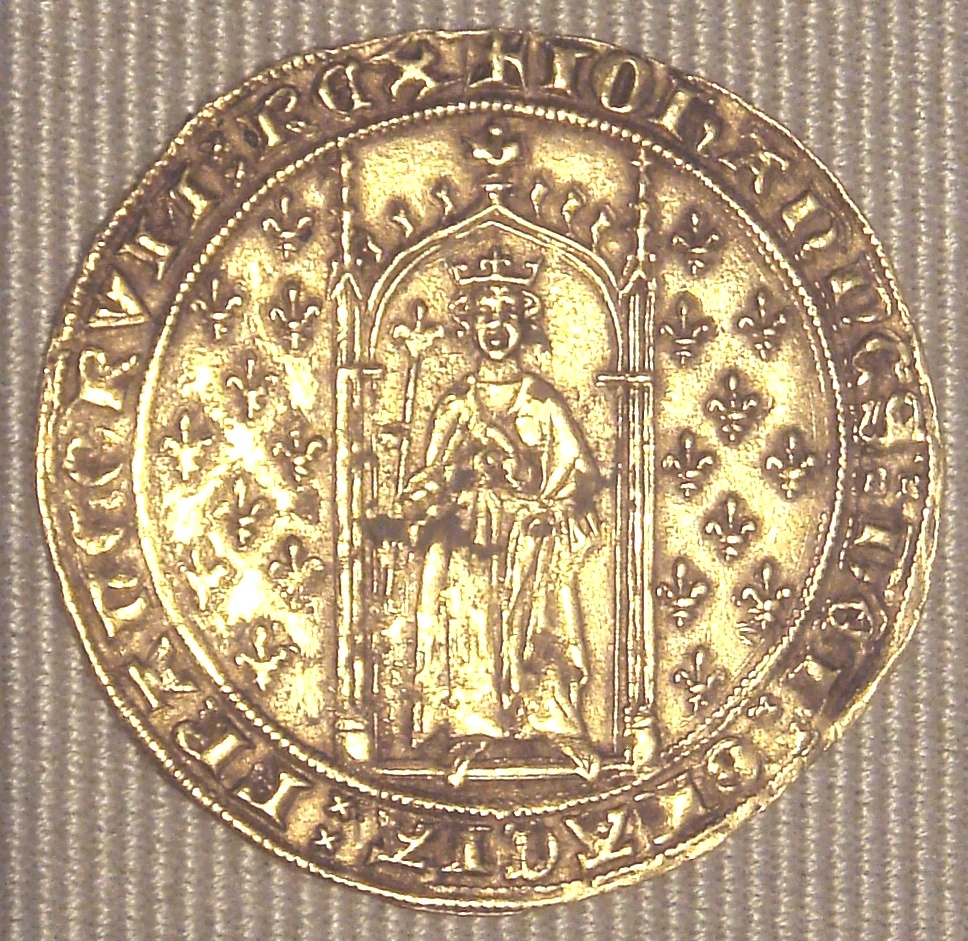
A denier d'or aux fleurs de lys from John's reign (1351)

Tension arose again in 1341. King Philip, worried about the richest area of the kingdom breaking into bloodshed, ordered the bailiffs of Bayeux and Cotentin to quell the dispute. Geoffroy d'Harcourt raised troops against the king, rallying a number of nobles protective of their autonomy and against royal interference. The rebels demanded that Geoffroy be made duke, thus guaranteeing the autonomy granted by the charter. Royal troops took the castle at Saint-Sauveur-le-Vicomte and Geoffroy was exiled to Brabant. Three of his companions were decapitated in Paris on 3 April 1344.

=== Meeting with the Avignon Papacy and the King of England ===
In 1342, John was in Avignon, then a part of the Papal States, at the coronation of Pope Clement VI, and in the latter part of 1343, he was a member of a peace parley with Edward III of England's chancery clerk. Clement VI was the fourth of seven Avignon Popes whose papacy was not contested, although the supreme pontiffs would ultimately return to Rome in 1378.

=== Relations with Normandy and rising tensions ===
By 1345, increasing numbers of Norman rebels had begun to pay homage to Edward III, constituting a major threat to the legitimacy of the Valois kings. The defeat at the Battle of Crécy on 26 August 1346, and the capitulation of Calais on 3 August 1347, after an eleven-month siege, further damaged royal prestige. Defections by the nobility, whose land fell within the broad economic influence of England, particularly in the north and west, increased. Consequently, King Philip VI decided to seek a truce. Duke John met Geoffroy d'Harcourt, to whom the king agreed to return all confiscated goods, even appointing him sovereign captain in Normandy. John then approached the Tancarville family, whose loyalty could ultimately ensure his authority in Normandy. The marriage of John, Viscount of Melun, to Jeanne, the only heiress of the county of Tancarville, ensured that the Melun-Tancarville party remained loyal to John, while Geoffroy d'Harcourt continued to act as defender for Norman freedoms and thus of the reforming party.

=== Black Death and second marriage ===
On 11 September 1349, John's wife, Bonne of Bohemia (Bonne de Luxembourg), died at the Maubuisson Abbey near Paris, of the Black Death, which was devastating Europe. To escape the pandemic, John, who was living in the Parisian royal residence, the Palais de la Cité, left Paris.

On 9 February 1350, five months after the death of his first wife, John married Joan I, Countess of Auvergne, in the royal Château de Sainte-Gemme (which no longer exists), at Feucherolles, near Saint-Germain-en-Laye.

=== The Dauphiné acquisition ===
In 1343, negotiations were initiated between John's father – king Philip VI, and dauphin Humbert II of Viennois, regarding the future inheritance of the Dauphiné, a vast feudal domain within the Kingdom of Burgundy (Arles), under the suzerainty of the Holy Roman Empire. Since Humbert had no heirs, it was initially agreed that his domains will pass to Johns's younger brother Philip, Duke of Orléans. Already in 1344, those provisions were changed by the new agreement, designating John as Humbert's heir in the Dauphiné.

By 1349, Humbert decided to relinquish his rule over Dauphiné in favour of the House of Valois, and the final agreement was made, designating John's oldest son Charles as Humbert's successor, on the condition that Dauphiné will remain a distinctive polity, not incorporated into the French kingdom. Thus in the summer of 1349, John's oldest son became the first Valois Dauphin de Viennois. In 1350, when John ascended to the French throne, his son Charles became the heir presumptive and thus for the first time both honors (Dauphin de Viennois, and heir to the French throne) were held by the same person.

== King of France ==
=== Coronation ===
Philip VI, John's father, died on 22 August 1350, and John's coronation as John II, king of France, took place in Reims the following 26 September. Joanna, his second wife, was crowned queen of France at the same time.

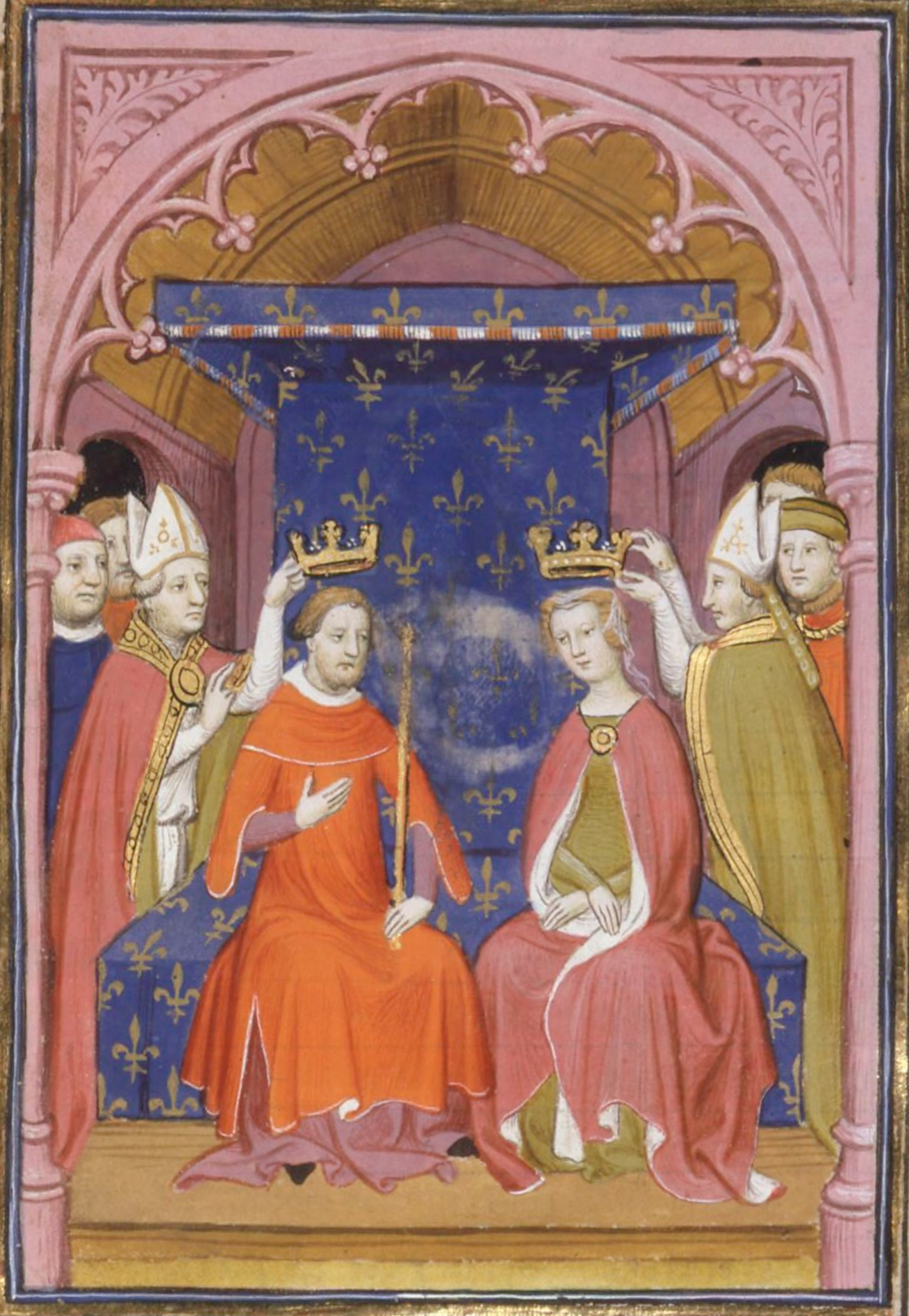
John being crowned King of France with his second wife Joan

In November 1350, King John had Raoul II of Brienne, Count of Eu seized and summarily executed, for reasons that remain unclear, although it was rumoured that he had pledged the English the County of Guînes for his release from captivity.

=== Military Ordinances of 1351 ===
John inherited a French military weakened by disorganization and feudal fragmentation, and seven months after being crowned king, he issued the ordinances of 1351 which sought to address these issues. Enacted in response to military setbacks, such as the French defeat at the Battle of Crécy in 1346, these ordinances aimed to address issues of organization, discipline, and payment within the French military, and serve as proof that John as a chivalrous king had an exact grasp of the inadequacies of the feudal army.

The military ordinances of 1351, issued by King John II the Good, are considered the first comprehensive military ordinances in French history due to their systematic approach to reforming the royal army during the Hundred Years' War. While earlier French monarchs, such as Philip Augustus, issued military-related decrees, none were as comprehensive or specifically focused on army-wide organization as John's ordinances.

Some of the aims of the provisions included:

- Centralizing command: Establishing royal authority over military operations to reduce noble autonomy. The ordinances established standardized rules for the recruitment, payment, and conduct of soldiers, marking a significant shift from the decentralized and often chaotic feudal levies to a more cohesive royal army under centralized control. These regulations included provisions for fixed wages and measures to curb indiscipline among troops.
- Institution of the "Montre" (Military Review System): To ensure accountability and proper equipping of troops. It mandated regular inspections, known as montres, to verify the number, equipment, and readiness of soldiers. Each combatant was required to be part of a company led by a captain, who was responsible for the unit's discipline and preparedness. Horses were marked to prevent soldiers from presenting the same mounts in multiple units to inflate numbers and claim additional pay. Wages were paid only after the montre, ensuring soldiers were properly equipped and present. This system aimed to curb fraud, reduce desertion, and ensure that only well-equipped soldiers received payment, marking a shift toward a more professional army.
- Regulating pay and service: Introducing paid contracts (soldes) to ensure loyalty and standardize service terms.
- Formation of Royal Companies: To replace disorganized feudal levies with a structured royal army. The ordinance organized soldiers into companies under the command of appointed captains. These companies integrated barons, vassals, and sub-vassals, placing them under royal authority rather than feudal lords. Captains were accountable to the king's representatives, such as the constable and marshals. This provision reduced the autonomy of feudal lords, centralizing military command under the crown. It laid the groundwork for the later compagnies d'ordonnance, a standing army formalized under Charles VII in 1445.
- Standardizing units: Organizing troops into smaller units (routes) led by appointed captains for better coordination.
- Limiting noble independence: Curtailing nobles' ability to act independently or abandon campaigns.
- Improving logistics: Enhancing provisioning to sustain campaigns.
- Discipline and Accountability: Captains were made responsible for their units' conduct, with strict oversight by the constable and marshals. The ordinance aimed to curb the lawlessness of troops, particularly when not engaged in active campaigns, as demobilized soldiers often turned to banditry.

These reforms aimed to counter the cohesive, professional English armies, which relied on longbowmen and centralized leadership.

==== Failure to Implement the Ordinances ====
The French nobility's resistance and internal divisions impeded the ordinances' adoption. Nobles, such as Charles of Navarre, viewed the reforms as a threat to their Feudal autonomy and traditional rights to command personal forces. Rivalries among noble factions, including Charles of Navarre and the Duke of Orléans caused political instability and undermined royal authority. Nobles had a resistance to discipline and resented serving under royal oversight or alongside common soldiers, as this clashed with their privileged status. The incomplete implementation of the ordinences by the nobility meant that their enforcement was inconsistent, with some captains adopting the structure while others ignored it. The crown's financial difficulties didn't help either, which forced reliance on feudal levies, limiting consistent payments to soldiers.

==== Impact on the Battle of Poitiers ====
The Battle of Poitiers saw the English, led by Edward, the Black Prince, defeat a larger French army under John. The failure to integrate the ordinances contributed to the French defeat in several ways:

- Lack of unified command: The French army (12,000–15,000) suffered from divisions among commanders, including John, the Dauphin Charles, and the Duke of Orléans, preventing coordination. Some contingents, like Orléans', fled or failed to engage.
- Poor tactical discipline: French knights reverted to impetuous charges, ignoring the ordinances' emphasis on disciplined tactics. Disorganized assaults failed against English defensive positions with longbowmen.
- Fragmented army structure: The French army, a mix of feudal levies and semi-professional units, lacked cohesion. The vanguard's impulsive attack under the Marshals of Clermont and Audrehem disrupted strategy.
- Logistical and morale issues: Supply problems, unaddressed due to incomplete logistical reforms, weakened morale. The English, better provisioned, maintained their defensive stance.
- Contrast with English effectiveness: The English army's cohesion, professional soldiers, and unified command exploited French disarray, using longbowmen and terrain effectively.

The French defeat at Poitiers had severe repercussions. The king's capture led to the Treaty of Brétigny (1360) which ceded territories to England (most of which were later recovered by Charles V), and thousands of French casualties, including nobles, further weakened the feudal structure. The battle exposed military weaknesses and highlighted the failure to overcome noble resistance, delaying military recovery until further reforms were enacted under Charles V.

==== Legacy ====
While John's military ordinances were ambitious, their effectiveness was limited by the structural and economic constraints of the time. Although the ordinances were not entirely successful due to challenges in enforcement and the ongoing pressures of war, they represented the foundational step toward modernizing the French military, setting an historical precedent for later military developments. Their emphasis on centralized control and discipline influenced subsequent reforms, notably Charles V's tactical and administrative reforms, and Charles VII's creation of a standing army and permanent taxation which solidified royal control. As a result, the feudal system evolved from a decentralized military structure to one where nobles were integrated into a royal framework, with the crown gaining significant power over the fragmented nobility. These changes enabled France to recover from defeats like Poitiers and ultimately win the Hundred Years' War by 1453.

=== Creation of the Order of the Star ===
On 16 November 1351, 3 months after creating the military reform ordinances of 1351, John established the Order of the Star, a chivalric order, to unify the French nobility under royal leadership and counter Edward III's Order of the Garter. Unlike earlier religious military orders (like the Templars and the Knights Hospitaller, etc.) the Order of the Star was a distinctly French, royal initiative. It was the first organized, state-sponsored group of knights in France with a clear military purpose tied to national defence, setting it apart from feudal levies or informal knightly groups. The order aimed to foster loyalty among knights and prevent defections to foreign powers, as many nobles held lands across multiple kingdoms due to marriage alliances. By binding the nobility to the crown through chivalric ideals, John sought to strengthen the loyalty and cohesion of his military elite, complementing the structural reforms of the April military ordinances.

=== Negotiations and falling out with Navarre ===
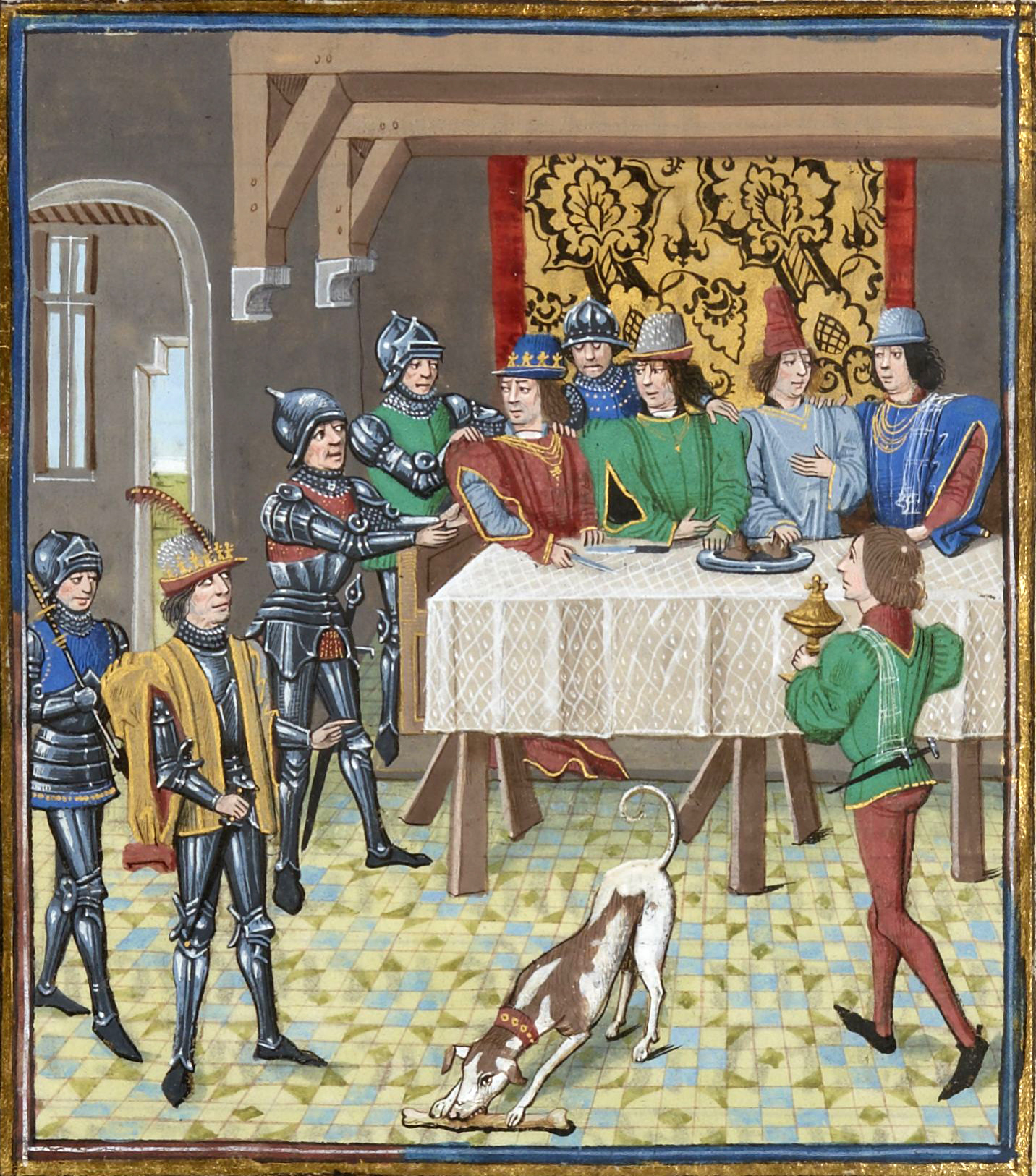
Arrest of Charles of Navarre at Rouen in 1356 (Chroniques de Froissart, Loyset Liedet, BnF, Manuscrit français 2 643 fº 197v).

In 1354, John's son-in-law and cousin, Charles II of Navarre, who, in addition to his Kingdom of Navarre in the Pyrenees mountains, bordering between France and Spain, also held extensive lands in Normandy, was implicated in the assassination of the Constable of France, Charles de la Cerda, who was the favourite of King John. Nevertheless, in order to have a strategic ally against the English in Gascony, John signed the Treaty of Mantes with Charles on 22 February 1354. The peace did not last between the two, and Charles eventually struck up an alliance with Henry of Grosmont, the first Duke of Lancaster.

The following year, on 10 September 1355 John and Charles signed the Treaty of Valognes, but this second peace lasted hardly any longer than the first culminating in a highly dramatic event where, during a banquet on 5 April 1356 at the Royal Castle in Rouen attended by the King's son Charles, Charles II of Navarre and a number of Norman magnates and notables, John II burst through the door in full armour, swords in hand, along with his entourage, which included the king's brother Phillip, younger son Louis and cousins as well as over a hundred fully armed knights waiting outside. John lunged over and grabbed Charles of Navarre shouting, "let no one move if he does not want to be dead with this sword." With John's son, Dauphin Charles, the banquet host, on his knees pleading for him to stop, the King grabbed Navarre by the throat and pulled him out of his chair yelling in his face, "Traitor, you are not worthy to sit at my son's table!" He then ordered the arrests of all the guests including Navarre and, in what many considered to be a rash move as well as a political mistake, he had John, the Count of Harcourt and several other Norman lords and notables summarily executed later that night in a yard nearby while he stood watching.

This act, which was largely driven by revenge for Charles of Navarre's and John of Harcourt's pre-meditated plot that killed John's favourite, Charles de La Cerda, would push much of what remaining support the King had from the lords in Normandy away to King Edward and the English camp, setting the stage for the English invasion and the resulting Battle of Poitiers in the months to come.

=== Battle of Poitiers ===
In 1355, the Hundred Years' War had flared up again, and in July 1356, Edward, the Black Prince, son of Edward III of England, took an army on a great chevauchée through France. John pursued him with an army of his own. In September the two forces met a few miles southeast of Poitiers.

John was confident of victory—his army was probably twice the size of his opponent's—but he did not immediately attack. While he waited, the papal legate went back and forth, trying to negotiate a truce between the leaders. There is some debate over whether the Black Prince wanted to fight at all. He offered his wagon train, which was heavily loaded with loot. He also promised not to fight against France for seven years. Some sources claim that he even offered to return Calais to the French crown. John countered by demanding that 100 of the Prince's best knights surrender themselves to him as hostages, along with the Prince himself. No agreement could be reached. Negotiations broke down, and both sides prepared for combat.

On the day of the battle, John and 17 knights from his personal guard dressed identically. This was done to confuse the enemy, who would do everything possible to capture the sovereign on the field. In spite of this precaution, following the destruction and routing of the massive force of French knights at the hands of the ceaseless English longbow volleys John was captured as the English force charged to finish their victory. John, who had dismounted to fight alongside his men wielding a battle-axe, continued to fight until Denis de Morbecque, a French exile who fought for England, approached him.

"Sire," Morbecque said. "I am a knight of Artois. Yield yourself to me and I will lead you to the Prince of Wales."

=== Surrender and capture ===
King John surrendered by handing him his glove. That night King John dined in the red silk tent of his enemy. The Black Prince attended to him personally. He was then taken to Bordeaux, and from there to England. The Battle of Poitiers would be one of the major military disasters not just for France, but at any time during the Middle Ages.

While negotiating a peace accord, John was at first held in the Savoy Palace, then at a variety of locations, including Windsor, Hertford, Somerton Castle in Lincolnshire, Berkhamsted Castle in Hertfordshire, and briefly at King John's Lodge, formerly known as Shortridges, in East Sussex. Eventually, John was taken to the Tower of London.

In France, what struck the people was not so much the defeat at Poitiers as the captivity of King John. When the French people learned of the frantic flight of the French lords from battle, they believed it was due to treason. And if not for English gold, they thought it was out of cowardice—and so, what did the once-revered words of 'honor' and 'nobility' mean? People began to hate the cowardly knights. Some of them, returning to their estates, narrowly escaped being torn apart by furious villeins, even those who, as prisoners on parole, came back to gather their ransoms.

=== Prisoner of the English ===
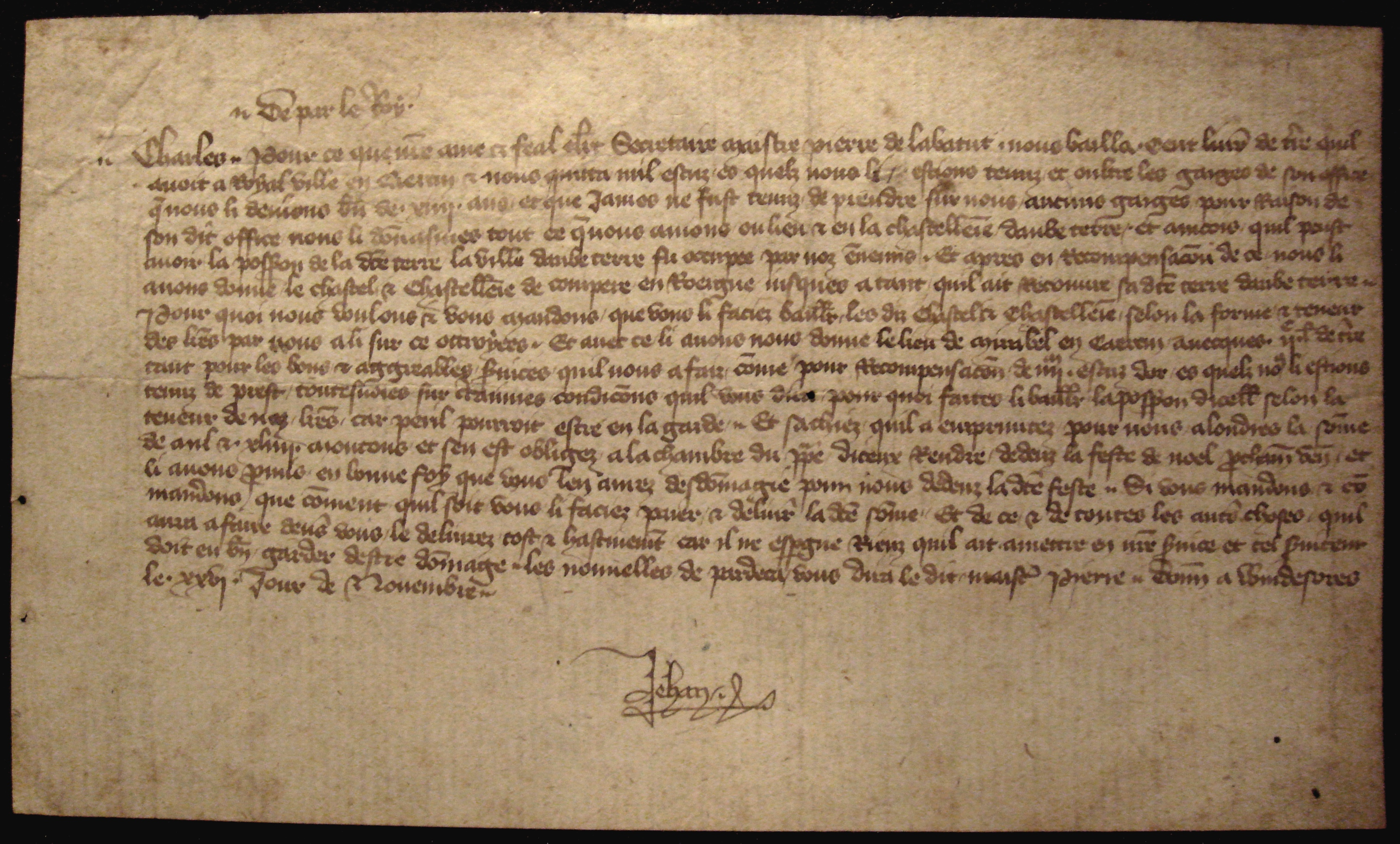
Letter of Jean le Bon during his captivity in Windsor, to his son Charles about Pierre de la Batut

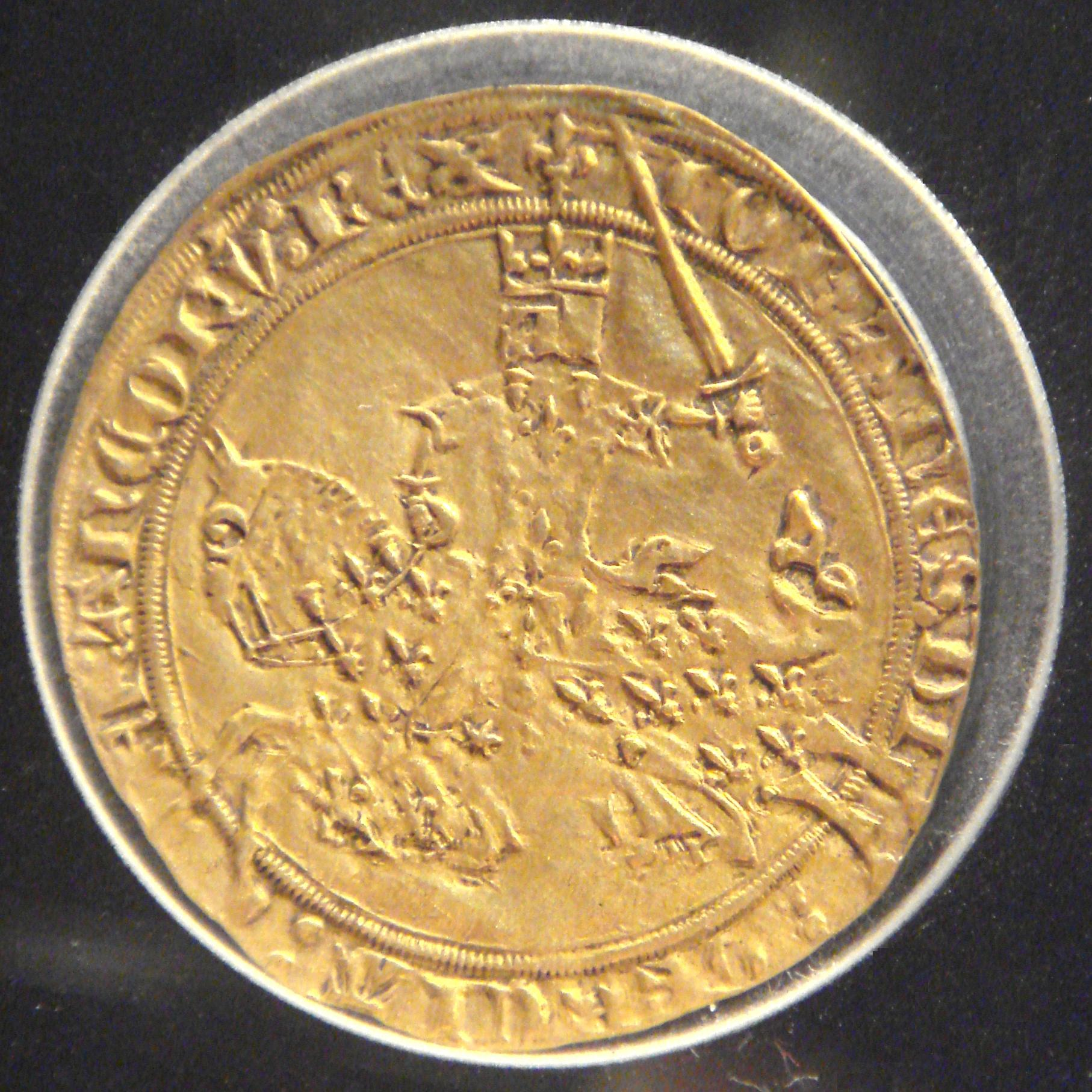
The first franc ever minted, the "Franc à cheval", was minted upon Jean le Bon's return from captivity from 5 December 1360, and featured combative imagery. Gold, 24 karat, 3.73g. Its weight is the account value of one livre tournois.

As a prisoner of the English, John was granted royal privileges that permitted him to travel about and enjoy a regal lifestyle. At a time when law and order was breaking down in France and the government was having a hard time raising money for the defence of the realm, his account books during his captivity show that he was purchasing horses, pets, and clothes while maintaining an astrologer and a court band.

=== Treaty of Brétigny ===
The Treaty of Brétigny (drafted in May 1360) set his ransom at an astounding 3 million crowns, roughly two or three years worth of revenue for the French Crown, which was the largest national budget in Europe during that period. On 30 June 1360 John left the Tower of London and proceeded to Eltham Palace where Queen Philippa had prepared a great farewell entertainment. Passing the night at Dartford, he continued towards Dover, stopping at the Maison Dieu of St Mary at Ospringe, and paying homage at the shrine of St Thomas Becket at Canterbury on 4 July. He dined with the Black Prince—who had negotiated the Treaty of Brétigny—at Dover Castle, and reached English-held Calais on 8 July.

Leaving his son Louis of Anjou in Calais as a replacement hostage to guarantee payment, John was allowed to return to France to raise the funds. The Treaty of Brétigny was ratified in October 1360.

=== Louis' escape and return to England ===
On 1 July 1363, King John was informed that Louis had broken his parole and escaped from Calais. Troubled by the dishonour of this action, and the arrears in his ransom, John gathered his royal council to announce that he would voluntarily return to captivity in England and negotiate with Edward in person. When faced with the opposition of his advisors, the king famously replied that "if good faith were banned from the Earth, she ought to find asylum in the hearts of kings". Immediately after he appointed his son Charles the Duke of Normandy to be regent and governor of France until his return.

=== Death ===
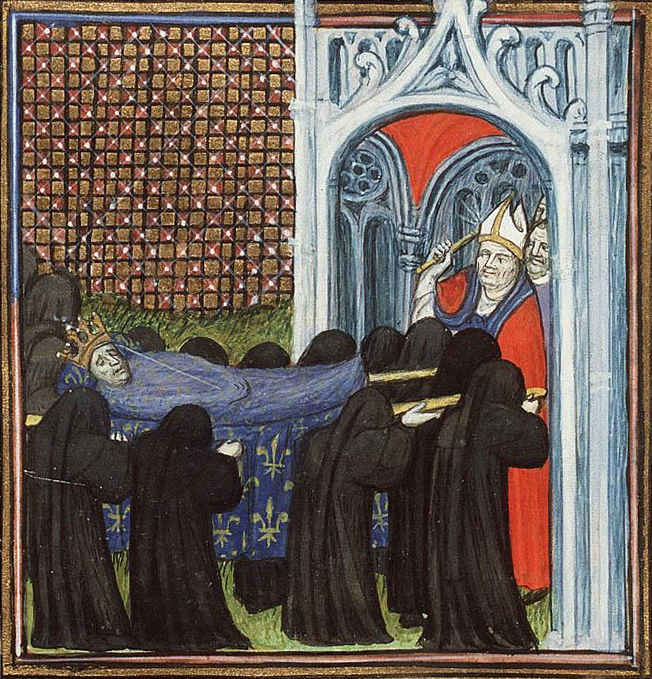
The funeral procession of Jean II

John landed in England in January 1364 where he was met by Sir Alan Buxhull, Sir Richard Pembridge and Lord Burghersh at Dover, to be conducted to Eltham and the Savoy Palace and was warmly welcomed in London in January 1364. He was received with great honour, and was a frequent guest of Edward at Westminster. A few months after his arrival, however, he fell ill with an unknown malady. He died at the Savoy Palace in April 1364. His body was returned to France, where he was interred in the royal chambers at Saint Denis Basilica.

The malady that caused John's death in 1364 at age 44 is not known; the Black Death, recurrent in the 1360s, or other infectious diseases are plausible causes, but no primary source confirms this. Speculation about arsenic poisoning, mentioned in relation to his son Charles V's illness, is not supported for John himself.

John II was succeeded as King of France by his eldest son, Charles, who reigned as Charles V, known as The Wise.

=== Physical health ===
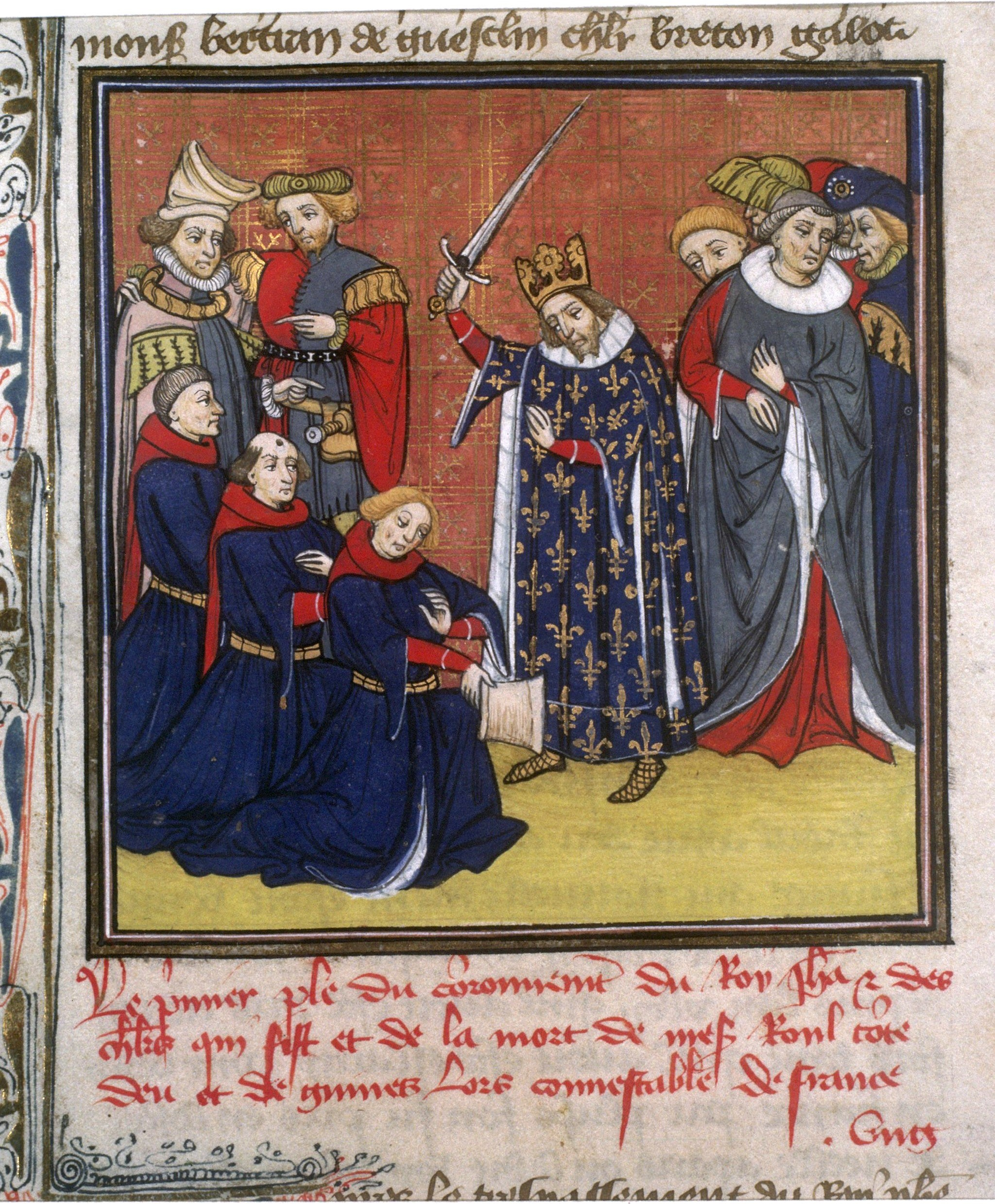
John II ennobling his knights, BNF

The claim that John continually suffered from ill health is uncorroborated in primary sources. Secondary sources such as those from Françoise Autrand and Jean Deviosse suggest John's health was not robust, citing limited participation in physical activities during his time in captivity and his death from an unspecified illness.

== Personal relationships ==
He took as his wife Bonne of Bohemia and fathered 11 children in eleven years. Due to his close relationship with his favourite Charles de la Cerda, partisans of Charles II of Navarre derided the king for "having no other God than him". La Cerda was given various honours and appointed to the high position of connetable when John became king; he accompanied the king on all his official journeys to the provinces. La Cerda's rise at court excited the jealousy of the French barons, several of whom stabbed him to death in 1354. La Cerda's fate paralleled that of Edward II of England's Piers Gaveston and John II of Castile's Álvaro de Luna; the position of a royal favourite was a dangerous one. John's grief on La Cerda's death was overt and public.

== Titles held by John II during his lifetime ==
John acquired the titles of Count of Anjou, Count of Maine, and Duke of Normandy in 1332 when he came of age, as part of his father, King Philip VI of France, granting him overlordship of several territories. Upon becoming King of France in 1350, most of his titles returned to the royal domain, as his new status as king absorbed his regional titles.

- Count of Anjou (1332–1350): The County of Anjou had returned to the French royal domain in 1328 upon Philip VI's ascension, and he bestowed it upon his eldest son, John, to strengthen his position as heir and to manage these key territories. This was a common practice to provide heirs with administrative experience and revenue. The County of Anjou later became a duchy in 1360, granted to John's son Louis.
- Count of Maine (1332–1350): Maine, closely tied to Anjou, was part of the same administrative package to prepare John for governance and to secure Valois control over these regions, which were strategically important due to their proximity to English-held territories. Maine was later integrated into the Duchy of Anjou.
- Duke of Normandy (1332–1350): Normandy was a critical region due to its economic importance and its vulnerability to English claims during the Hundred Years' War. John's appointment as Duke was intended to secure loyalty in a region with strong economic ties to England. He later granted it to his son, Charles (the future Charles V), in 1355, to ensure effective governance during his own captivity after the Battle of Poitiers.
- Count of Poitiers (1344–1350): He was created Count of Poitiers in 1344 by his father, Philip VI, as part of consolidating Valois control over southwestern France. Poitiers was strategically significant during the early stages of the Hundred Years' War, and granting it to John strengthened royal authority in the region against English claims.
- Duke of Guyenne (1345–1350): Guienne was a medieval name for a region in southwestern France that largely overlapped with the historical Duchy of Aquitaine. The name "Guienne" derives from an Old French rendering of "Aquitaine", and by the 14th century, it was often used interchangeably with or as a subset of Aquitaine. John held this title as part of the French crown's control over the region, which had been a contested area between France and England for centuries (notably during the Hundred Years' War). At that time, the Duchy of Guienne/Aquitaine included Bordeaux and parts of Gascony, though its borders fluctuated due to political and military changes.
- Count of Auvergne (1350–1360): He became Count of Auvergne in 1350 through his marriage to Joan I, Countess of Auvergne and Boulogne, on 19 February 1350, at Nanterre. As Joan's husband, he held the title jure uxoris (by right of his wife), as was customary for husbands of titled heiresses in medieval France. John relinquished the title in 1360 when she died. Upon her death, the title reverted to Joan's heirs, as John's rights were tied to her lifetime.
- Count of Boulogne (1350–1360): He acquired the title of Count of Boulogne jure uxoris in 1350 through his marriage to Joan I, on 19 February 1350. Boulogne was a significant coastal county, and John's control reinforced Valois influence in northern France. The title was relinquished upon Joan's death in 1360, with the title passing to Joan's heirs.
- Duke of Burgundy (as John I) (1361–1363): Upon the death of Philip I, Duke of Burgundy (Philip of Rouvres), in 1361, the senior line of the House of Burgundy, descended from Robert I, became extinct. Philip I died without heirs. John was the son of Joan of Burgundy, the second daughter of Duke Robert II of Burgundy, making him a first cousin to Philip I's father. Charles II of Navarre, another claimant, was the grandson of Margaret of Burgundy, the elder daughter of Robert II, giving him a claim through primogeniture. However, the principle of proximity of blood favoured John, as he was closer in degree of kinship to the deceased duke. Additionally, John's position as king and his role as stepfather to Philip I (through his marriage to Joan I, Countess of Auvergne) strengthened his claim, and on 28 December 1361, John successfully claimed the duchy. The duchy did not merge into the royal domain; it remained a distinct feudal entity, with the Burgundian estates firmly opposing annexation. In January 1362, John appointed John of Melun, Count of Tancarville, as governor of Burgundy before finally passing the duchy on to his youngest son Philip as an apanage in 1363.

== Creation of Counties, Duchies and Apanages ==
John II created several duchies and counties – seven in total, the most out of any French monarch (with Charles IX and Francis I being second and third respectively). Most of them lasted until the French Revolution abolished the monarchy. During his reign he also expanded French territory and influence by acquiring the Duchy of Burgundy, creating the Duchy of Auvergne, and by placing his sons in strategic positions of power to insure the protection of French territory.

=== County of Tancarville (1352 to 1844) ===
John elevated the Barony of Tancarville to a county and created Jean, Viscount of Melun the new Count of Tancarville. He was already a close friend of John when the latter was still Duke of Normandy, before succeeding his father Philip VI in 1350. The Count then held a number of high-ranking offices, serving simultaneously as Chamberlain of France, Hereditary Constable of Normandy, Sovereign Master of the Waters and Forests of France, and perhaps, at one point, Sovereign Master of the King's Household. He also had solid military experience, having served in the King's armies since 1337; he had taken part in the Battle of Poitiers in 1356 and was captured there by the English. Upon his return from captivity, he was entrusted by the King with important missions of both a political and military nature. The Count of Tancarville played a significant role in the attempt to pacificate the kingdom. To combat the Free Companies, John the Good entrusted him, on 24 April 1361, with a lieutenancy general, under which he could exercise all the king's powers in the Duchy of Berry, the County of Nevers, the Duchies of Bourbon and Auvergne, regions particularly threatened by the Routiers.

=== The Duchy of Bar (1354 to 1766) ===
The County of Bar, located between France and the Holy Roman Empire, was strategically vital due to its position near Lorraine and Luxembourg. Part of Bar (the Barrois mouvant) had become a French fief in 1301, but its proximity to imperial territories made it a contested area. Elevating Bar to a duchy allowed John to reinforce French authority in this borderland, especially during the Hundred Years' War, when English influence threatened nearby regions like Normandy. John made efforts to secure loyalty from frontier nobles to counter external threats, suggesting the elevation was a strategic move to bind Bar more closely to the French crown.

The first Duke of Bar, Robert I's later actions, such as supporting the coronations of Charles V and Charles VI, reflect his role as a loyal vassal. The ducal title enhanced Bar's status, giving Robert greater influence in both French and imperial contexts, as Bar also gained recognition from Emperor Charles IV.

=== The County of Castres (1356 to 1789) ===
John elevated Castres to a county in 1356 and created John VI of Vendôme as Count of Castres, alongside his existing title as Count of Vendôme, as part of a strategic effort to strengthen royal authority, reward loyal vassals, and stabilize the French crown's influence during a period of crisis marked by the Hundred Years' War, the Black Death, and internal political turmoil.

John VI of Vendôme, a member of the House of Montoire, was a loyal vassal who fought for the French crown, notably at the Battle of Poitiers in 1356, where he was captured by the English. Elevating Castres to a county and granting John VI the title was likely a reward for his service and a means to secure his continued loyalty, especially during a time when noble defections to the English were a significant threat. John frequently used titles and land grants to bind nobles to the crown, particularly in regions vulnerable to English influence, such as the south and west of France where Castres was located. The elevation enhanced John VI's status, aligning his interests with the crown and reinforcing his role as a regional power. Such appointments were critical during John's reign, as he sought to counter English aggression and internal rebellions like the Jacquerie. John VI's role as count also positioned him to manage local governance, particularly after his wife, Jeanne de Ponthieu, acted as regent for their granddaughter Jeanne, Countess of Vendôme and Castres, from 1371 to 1372.

Castres, located in Languedoc, was a dependency of the Viscount of Albi and had been granted a city charter during the Albigensian Crusade, indicating its regional significance. By elevating Castres to a county, John aimed to integrate it more firmly into the French feudal structure, countering local autonomy and potential English economic influence in the south, and to assert control over southern territories, where English campaigns and local unrest threatened royal authority. Granting the county to John VI, a trusted noble, ensured a loyal administrator in a region critical for maintaining French dominance.

=== The Duchy of Anjou (1360 to 1795) ===
In 1360, the Duchy of Anjou, was created and granted to Louis I of Anjou, John's second son, elevating the county of Anjou to a duchy. This apanage included the counties of Anjou and Maine, centered in western France, a region critical for its proximity to English-held Aquitaine and Brittany, both contested during the Hundred Years' War. The grant coincided with the Treaty of Brétigny, which temporarily ended hostilities with England but required John to cede significant territories. By establishing Louis in Anjou, John aimed to secure a loyal royal presence in a region vulnerable to English influence and Breton autonomy. Louis was also given a role as a hostage in England under the treaty's terms, reflecting John's strategy to tie apanages to diplomatic obligations. The elevation of Anjou to a duchy increased its prestige, ensuring Louis's status matched his responsibilities. Anjou's strategic location made it a bulwark against English expansion from Aquitaine and a counterweight to the semi-independent Duchy of Brittany. Louis I of Anjou became a powerful figure, later pursuing claims to Naples and Sicily, expanding the Angevin dynasty's influence beyond France. His apanage laid the foundation for the Valois-Anjou branch, which played a significant role in French and European politics. The Duchy of Anjou remained a key royal stronghold, though its autonomy under Louis's successors sometimes challenged crown authority.

=== The Duchy of Touraine (1360 to 1584) ===
Created as an initial apanage for his youngest son, Philip II the Bold. However, when the Duchy of Burgundy became available in 1363, Philip received Burgundy instead, partly as a reward for his courage at the battle of Poitiers, and Touraine was reassigned or reverted to the crown temporarily. Touraine, located in western France, was a smaller but strategically important duchy due to its proximity to Anjou and Poitou. The initial grant of Touraine to Philip in 1360 was part of John's effort to provide for all his sons following the Treaty of Brétigny. Touraine's strategic location near Anjou and Brittany made it valuable for maintaining royal influence in western France. The reassignment of Touraine after 1363 reflects John's flexibility in reallocating apanages to maximize strategic outcomes. When Burgundy, a more prestigious and critical duchy, became available, Philip was given the larger prize, and Touraine was reserved for other uses or returned to the crown. Touraine's temporary status as an apanage indicates its role as a flexible tool in John's feudal strategy, used to balance familial and political needs. Touraine's brief tenure as an apanage for Philip had limited long-term impact, as it was overshadowed by the grant of Burgundy. However, its initial creation reflects John's intent to ensure all his sons had significant holdings to support their status and loyalty. Touraine later became an apanage for other royal relatives under John's successors, reinforcing its role as a "floating" apanage for royal cadets.

=== The Duchy of Auvergne (1360 to 1723) ===
The Duchy of Auvergne was created from the Terre royale d'Auvergne (royal lands of Auvergne) while the County of Auvergne continued to exist in parallel. John granted it to his third son John alongside the Duchy of Berry. Auvergne, in south-central France, had been part of the royal domain since its confiscation by Philip II Augustus in 1209 and partial restoration to local counts. The elevation of Auvergne to a duchy was a strategic move to strengthen royal control in a region with a history of autonomy and pro-English sympathies among some local lords (e.g., the Counts of Auvergne). By granting it to John, King John aimed to secure Auvergne's loyalty during the Hundred Years' War. John's role as king's lieutenant in Auvergne (since 1358) made him a logical choice for the apanage. The grant formalized his authority, countering local resistance and English influence in the region. The creation of the duchy alongside Berry reflects John's intent to consolidate central and southern France under a trusted son, especially after the territorial losses of the Treaty of Brétigny. John of Berry held Auvergne until his death in 1416, when it reverted to the crown. His daughter Marie inherited the title of Duchess of Auvergne, and it later passed to her husband, John I, Duke of Bourbon, in 1426, integrating Auvergne into the Bourbon domains. The apanage reinforced royal authority in Auvergne, though John's heavy taxation to fund war efforts sparked revolts, such as the Tuchin Revolt, highlighting the challenges of governing the region.

=== The Duchy of Berry (1360 to 14 February 1820) ===
John created the Duchy of Berry for his third son John, encompassing the County of Berry and parts of Poitou. Centered in central France, Berry was a relatively stable region, strategically important for connecting northern and southern royal domains. The creation of the Duchy was part of John's 1360 reorganization of apanages following the Treaty of Brétigny. Berry's central location made it a hub for royal administration and a buffer against internal dissent, such as the Jacquerie revolt (1358). John of Berry, appointed king's lieutenant in 1358 for regions including Auvergne and Languedoc, was a key figure in John's government. The apanage provided him with the resources to govern effectively and support royal policies. Unlike Anjou or Burgundy, Berry was less exposed to immediate external threats, making it a stable base for John's administrative and artistic patronage. John of Berry became a renowned patron of the arts, commissioning works like the Très Riches Heures du Duc de Berry. His governance strengthened royal influence in central France, with Berry remaining closely tied to the crown. The apanage's stability contrasted with the autonomy of Burgundy and Anjou, reflecting John's loyalty and the region's integration into the royal domain.

== Historical assessment ==
=== Jean Froissart and Contemporary Chroniclers ===
The earliest significant criticism of John II likely stems from contemporary or near-contemporary chroniclers, particularly Jean Froissart (c. 1337–c. 1405), a Hainaut-born chronicler whose Chronicles are a primary source for the Hundred Years' War. Froissart writes of John's decision to fight on foot with a poleaxe, portraying it as courageous but implying it was reckless given the French defeat.

Froissart's account was influential because it was widely circulated in medieval Europe and became a foundational source for later historians. His depiction of John II's capture and lavish lifestyle in English captivity—engaging in feasts, hunting, and pilgrimages—contributed to perceptions of a king more concerned with personal honor than governance. While Froissart does not explicitly condemn John, he focuses extensively on the king's extravagance and military failure.

Another contemporary source, Jean de Venette (c. 1307–c. 1370), a Carmelite friar emphasizes the external pressures John faced, such as the Black Death and economic collapse.

=== Portrayal by Early Modern Historians ===
Jules Michelet (1798–1874), a 19th-century French historian whose Histoire de France (1833–1867) is a landmark in French historiography, criticized John II for his "weakness" and "extravagance", particularly highlighting the Poitiers defeat and the Treaty of Brétigny as catastrophic for French sovereignty. Michelet portrayed John as a well-meaning but ineffectual ruler, overly reliant on favourites like Charles de la Cerda.

Michelet's work was influential; historians that cited it include:

1. François Guizot (1787–1874): A prominent historian and statesman, Guizot's History of France (1829–1830) drew on Michelet's framework and Froissart's chronicles. Guizot emphasized John II's military failures and the economic devastation caused by the ransom payments, portraying the king as a symbol of feudal incompetence.

2. Charles Petit-Dutaillis (1868–1947): In his The Feudal Monarchy in France and England (1933), Petit-Dutaillis cited Michelet and Guizot, focusing on John II's inability to centralize royal authority amidst noble defections and English aggression. He described John's reign as a low point in Valois legitimacy.

3. Edouard Perroy (1901–1974): Perroy's The Hundred Years War (1945) built on Petit-Dutaillis and Michelet, explicitly citing their works. He criticized John II for his strategic blunders at Poitiers and his failure to manage noble factions, particularly Charles II of Navarre.

4. Jean Deviosse (1920–1992): In Jean le Bon (1985), Deviosse offered a more nuanced view, acknowledging John's courage and chivalric ideals but still framing his reign as a failure due to the Poitiers debacle and financial mismanagement. Deviosse cited Froissart, Michelet, and Perroy.

5. Maurice Keen (1933–2012): In The Pelican History of Medieval Europe (1969), Keen cited Perroy and Michelet, describing John II as a king overwhelmed by circumstances, with his capture at Poitiers symbolizing the collapse of French royal authority.

=== Modern assessments ===
Françoise Autrand, in Charles V: Le Sage (1994), contrasts John's failures with his son Charles V's successes but acknowledges John's efforts to maintain Valois legitimacy amidst unprecedented crises. Autrand cites Deviosse and Froissart but emphasizes the structural challenges—such as the decentralized feudal system and the economic impact of the Black Death—over personal failings.

In A Distant Mirror, Barbara Wertheim Tuchman describes John as someone who "...never made a wise choice between alternatives and seemed incapable of considering consequences of an action in advance."

D'Arcy Boulton details John II's establishment of the Order of the Star in 1351, which attempted to strengthen royal authority and unify the French nobility; Boulton notes its limited success due to political fragmentation and military defeats.

== Ancestry ==
Ancestors of John II of France

8. Philip III of France
4. Charles I, Count of Valois
9. Isabella of Aragon
2. Philip VI of France
10. Charles II of Naples
5. Margaret, Countess of Anjou
11. Mary of Hungary
1. John II of France
12. Hugh IV, Duke of Burgundy
6. Robert II, Duke of Burgundy
13. Yolande of Dreux
3. Joan of Burgundy
14. Louis IX of France
7. Agnes of France
15. Margaret of Provence

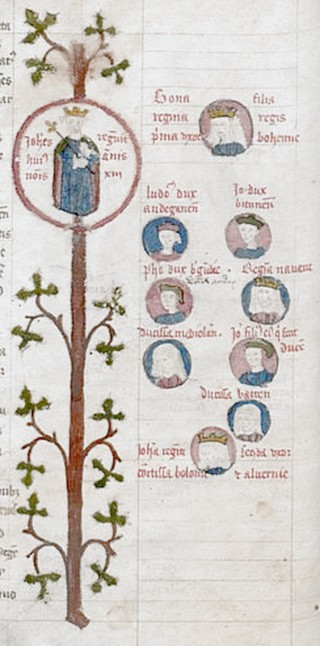
John's family tree

== Issue ==
On 28 July 1332, at the age of 13, John was married to Bonne of Luxembourg (d. 1349), daughter of John, King of Bohemia. Their children were:

1. Charles V of France (21 January 1338 – 16 September 1380)
2. Catherine (1338–1338) died young
3. Louis I, Duke of Anjou (23 July 1339 – 20 September 1384), married Marie of Blois
4. John, Duke of Berry (30 November 1340 – 15 June 1416), married Jeanne of Auvergne
5. Philip II, Duke of Burgundy (17 January 1342 – 27 April 1404), married Margaret of Flanders
6. Joan (24 June 1343 – 3 November 1373), married Charles II (the Bad) of Navarre
7. Marie (12 September 1344 – October 1404), married Robert I, Duke of Bar
8. Agnes (9 December 1345 – April 1350)
9. Margaret (20 September 1347 – 25 April 1352)
10. Isabelle (1 October 1348 – 11 September 1372), married Gian Galeazzo I, Duke of Milan

On 19 February 1350, at the royal Château de Sainte-Gemme, John married Joanna I of Auvergne (d. 1361), Countess of Auvergne and Boulogne. Joanna was the widow of Philip of Burgundy, the deceased heir of that duchy, and the mother of the young Philip I, Duke of Burgundy (1344–61) who became John's stepson and ward. John and Joanna had three children, all of whom died shortly after birth:

1. Blanche (b. November 1350)
2. Catherine (b. early 1352)
3. a son (b. early 1353)

== See also ==
- Treasure of rue Vieille-du-Temple

== Sources ==
- Guiffrey, Jules (1868). Histoire de la réunion du Dauphiné à la France. Paris: Académie des bibliophiles.
- Kibler, William W.; Zinn, Grover A., eds. (2011) [1995]. Medieval France: An Encyclopedia. New York and London: Routledge. ISBN 978-1-351-66566-7.
- Autrand, Françoise (1994). Charles V: Le Sage. Paris: Fayard. ISBN 978-2-213-59258-9.
- Froissart, Jean (1978). Chronicles. Translated by Geoffrey Brereton. London: Penguin Books. ISBN 978-0-14-044200-7.
- Michelet, Jules (1855–1867). Histoire de France. Vol. 4. Paris: Hachette. pp. 112–118.
- Guizot, François (1873). History of France from the Earliest Times to 1848. Vol. 2. Translated by Robert Black. London: Sampson Low, Marston, Low, and Searle. pp. 89–94. ISBN 978-0-19-822613-0.
- Petit-Dutaillis, Charles (1933). The Feudal Monarchy in France and England from the Tenth to the Thirteenth Century. Translated by E. D. Hunt. London: Routledge. pp. 256–260. ISBN 978-1-136-20247-6.
- Perroy, Edouard (1951). The Hundred Years War. Translated by W. B. Wells. London: Eyre & Spottiswoode. pp. 134–139. ISBN 978-0-413-28880-6.
- Deviosse, Jean (1985). Jean le Bon. Paris: Fayard. pp. 220–225. ISBN 978-2-213-01558-3.
- Keen, Maurice (1969). The Pelican History of Medieval Europe. Harmondsworth: Penguin Books. pp. 162–165. ISBN 978-0-14-021085-9.
- Venette, Jean de (1953). Richard A. Newhall (ed.). The Chronicle of Jean de Venette. Translated by Jean Birdsall. New York: Columbia University Press. pp. 78–82. ISBN 978-0-231-90854-2.
- Roland Delachenal, ed. (1910). Grandes Chroniques de France. Vol. 6. Paris: Société de l’Histoire de France. pp. 245–247.
- Walsingham, Thomas (1987). G. M. A. Richmond (ed.). The St Albans Chronicle. Translated by John Taylor. Oxford: Clarendon Press. pp. 312–315. ISBN 978-0-19-822167-8.
- Boulton, D’A.J.D. (2000). The Knights of the Crown: The Monarchical Orders of Knighthood in Later Medieval Europe, 1325–1520. Boydell Press. ISBN 978-0-85115-795-5.
- Bordonove, Georges. Jean II: le Bon (1350-1364), Fils de Philippe VI: Les Rois Qui Ont Fait la France. Pygmalion. ISBN 978-2-7564-1187-3.

John II of France House of Valois Cadet branch of the Capetian dynasty Born: 16 April 1319 Died: 8 April 1364
Regnal titles
| Preceded by Philip VI | King of France; 1350–1364 | Succeeded by Charles V |
French nobility
| Vacant Title last held by Henry III | Duke of Normandy; 1332–1350 | Succeeded by Charles |
| Vacant Title last held by Philip | Count of Anjou and Maine; 1332–1350 | Vacant Title next held by Louis I |
| Vacant Title last held by Philip V (as Philip I) | Count of Poitiers (as John I); 1344–1350 | Succeeded by John, Duke of Berry (as John II) |
| Preceded by Philip I | Duke of Burgundy (as John I); 1361–1363 | Succeeded by Philip II |
