= Treasure of rue Vieille-du-Temple =

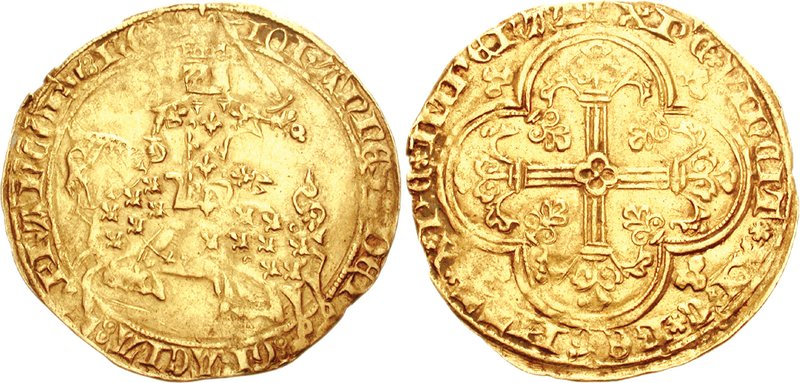
A Franc à cheval of John the Good

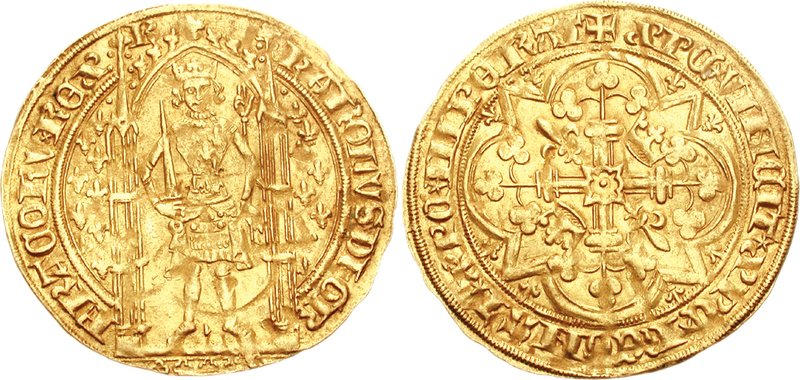
A Franc à pied of Charles V

The Treasure of rue Vieille-du-Temple is a collection of 7822 gold coins discovered by chance in 1882 in a building on rue Vieille-du-Temple in Paris. The coins date to the 14th and 15th centuries.

On 6 June 1882 the hotel Effiat Marshal on rue Vieille-du-Temple was being demolished to open a way towards rue des Écouffes when a large copper container was discovered buried in the garden of the hotel. The 7822 gold coins were found in the container, and were soon safeguarded, so none vanished.

The collection had 1010 coins of John the Good and 6199 coins of Charles V. The other coins had various origins, e.g. Joan of Naples and Louis I of Anjou. The 7822 coins had an average weight of 3.80 grams and a total weight of about 29 kilograms of gold. The origin of the treasure remains uncertain, but its date of burial is around 1380. It might be linked to the Maillotins revolt in 1382 with the execution of many wealthy people, some of whom would have hidden their coins before being arrested.

The treasure was studied in detail by the numismatist M. Stédransky, who published its composition two months after its discovery. The coins were auctioned on February 15, 1883. The new street whose construction caused the discovery is called "rue du Trésor".

== Sources ==
- M.Stédransky, Catalogue de monnaies françaises : trouvaille faite le 6 juin 1882 rue Vieille-du-Temple .
