= Treaty of Mantes =

1354 treaty between Navarre and France

The Treaty of Mantes was affirmed between Charles II of Navarre and John II of France on 22 February 1354. After Charles began negotiating with Edward the Black Prince and Henry of Grosmont, John II, in order to secure his alliance against England, sent Robert le Coq to Mantes to negotiate his own peace treaty with the king of Navarre. By the treaty, Charles was created Count of Beaumont-le-Roger and John made many concessions, but the peace he desired was not sustained. Charles concluded an alliance with Henry of Grosmont later that year. This forced new negotiations, which led to the Treaty of Valognes, the next year.

== Sources ==
- Funk, Arthur Layton. "Robert Le Coq and Etienne Marcel." Speculum, Vol. 19, No. 4 (Oct., 1944), pp 470–487.
- Zacour, Norman P. "Talleyrand: The Cardinal of Périgord (1301-1364)." Transactions of the American Philosophical Society, New Ser., Vol. 50, No. 7. (1960), pp 1–83.
