= Valognes Abbey =

Benedictine abbey in Valognes, France

Coordinates: 49.5035°N 1.4634°W

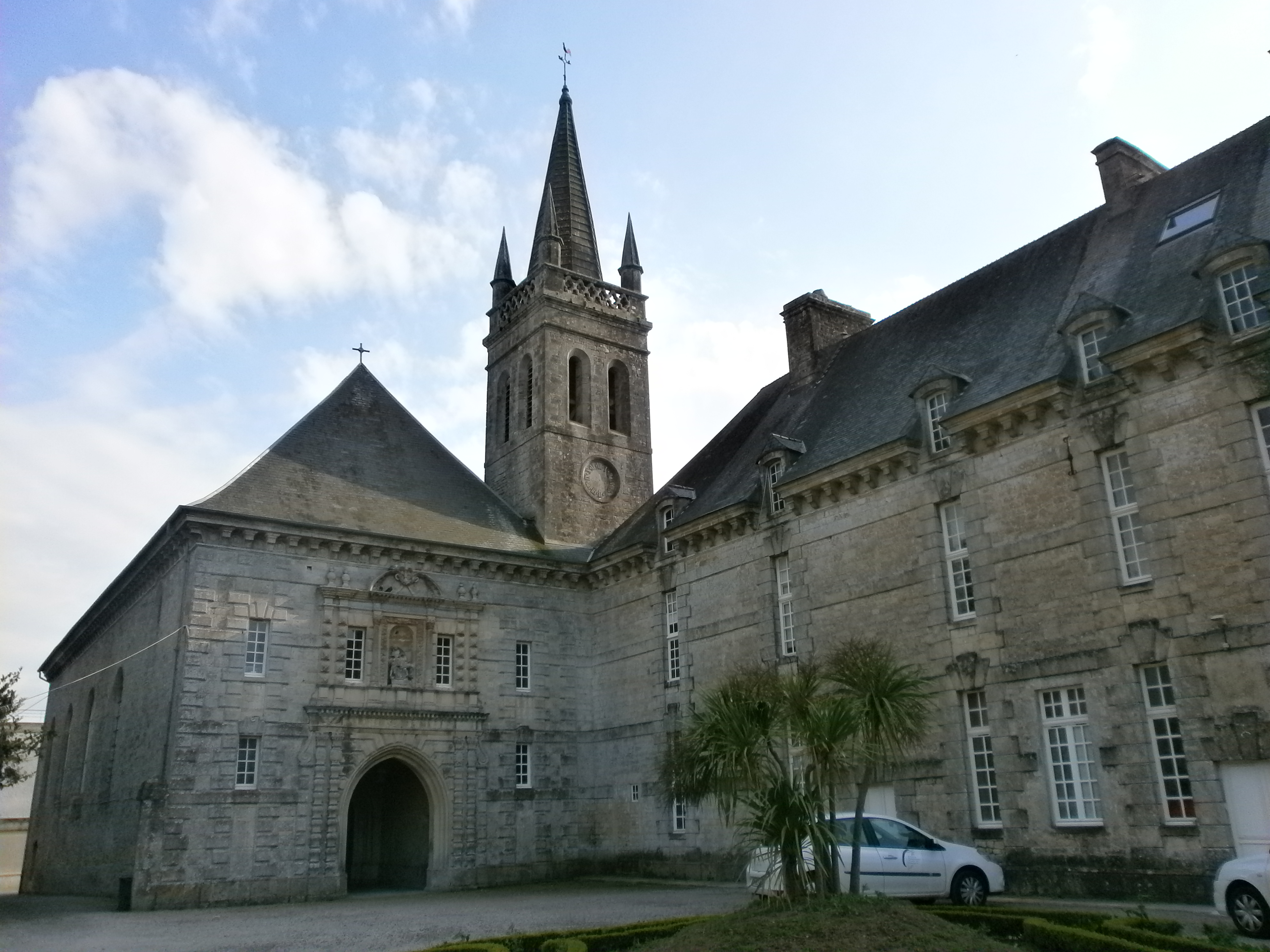
The exterior of Valognes Abbey, now the Hôpital de Valognes.

Valognes Abbey (French: Abbaye Notre-Dame de Protection de Valognes) is a 17th-century Benedictine abbey located in Valognes, France.

== Establishment ==
In 1623, Jean de Raval, Lord Tourlaville, and his wife Madeleine de la Vigne offered de la Vigne's cousin enough money to establish a monastery on the proviso that de la Vigne's would become the first abbess or "superior". The following year, the Bishop of Séez gave permission for a group of nuns to join the new abbey.

Plague prevented the nuns from taking up their new posts and construction did not begin until 1631. Later that year, enough construction had been completed so as to offer the nuns basic shelter and some took up residence. Finally King Louis XIII awarded a charter to Charlotte de la Vigne but she was not officially appointed until 1647. Construction was finally completed in October of that year.

== Later history ==
Like other abbeys of France, Valognes suffered during the French Revolution and the persecution of religious orders.

During World War II, the abbey and its surroundings were heavily bombed. In a single fortnight in June 1944, 84 bombs fell in the monastery. The nuns returned to a heavily damaged abbey. In 1953, a nun who had taken refuge in the abbey during World War I returned, was elected superior and led efforts to rebuild the monastery.

Though the abbey remains active, with resident nuns, most of the buildings have now been converted into the modern Hôpital de Valognes.

== See also ==
- List of Benedictine monasteries in France
