= Treaty of Valognes =

1355 treaty between Navarre and France

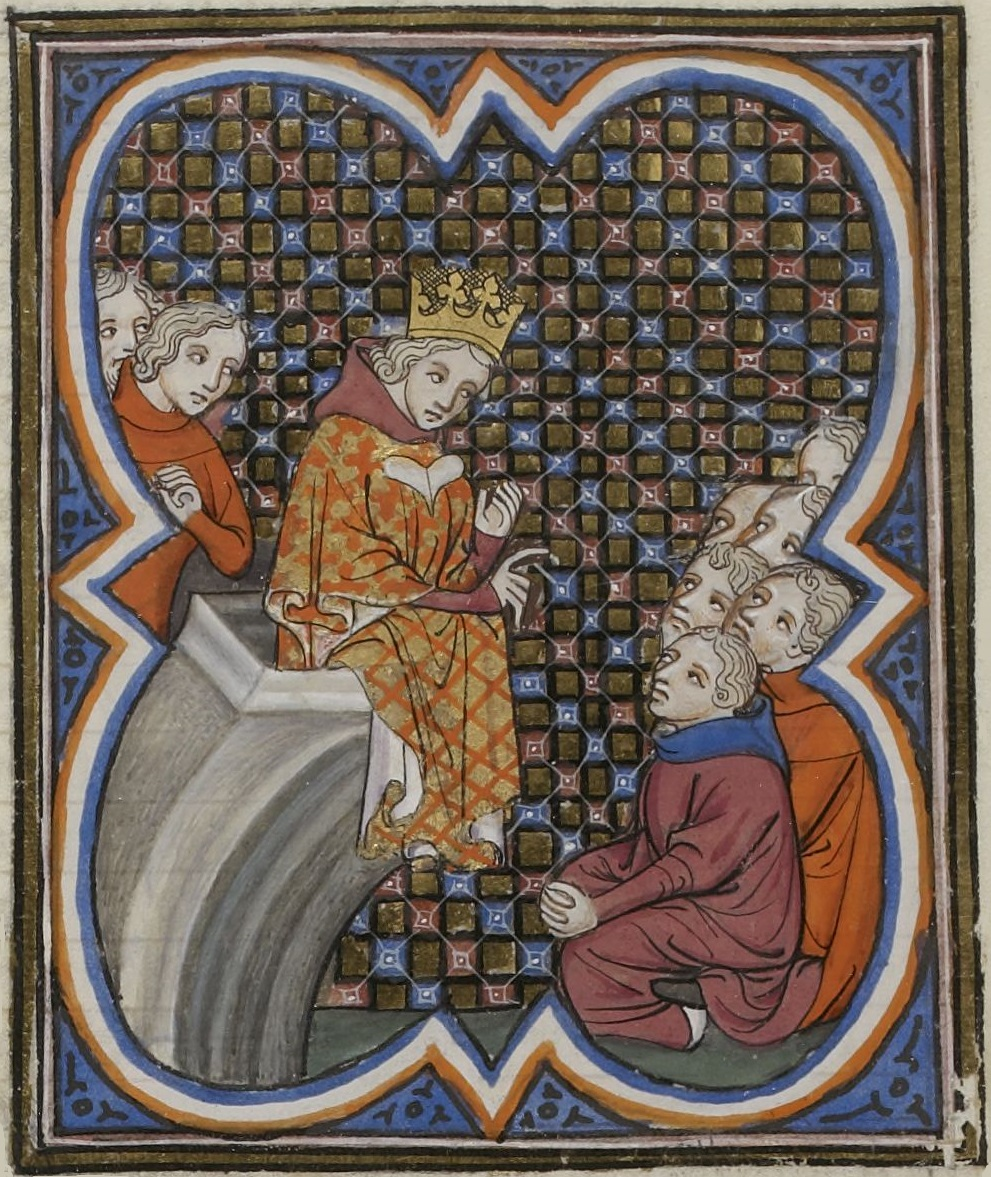

The Treaty of Valognes was a treaty signed on 10 September 1355 between Charles II of Navarre and John II of France. It was designed to unite the two kings against Edward III of England in preparation for a continuation of the Hundred Years' War. Charles and John had until then been at odds over Charles' claim to the French throne.

On 22 February 1354, by the Treaty of Mantes, John first came to terms with Charles, even though the latter had helped to assassinate the French king's constable, Charles de la Cerda. The peace did not last between the two and Charles eventually struck up an alliance with Henry of Grosmont, the first Duke of Lancaster. But the next year he signed a treaty with John at Valognes. This second peace hardly lasted longer than the first.

== Sources ==
- Zacour, Norman P. "Talleyrand: The Cardinal of Périgord (1301-1364)." Transactions of the American Philosophical Society, New Ser., Vol. 50, No. 7. (1960), pp 1–83.
- Lodge, Eleanor C. Gascony under English Rule. Kennikat Press: London, 1926.
