= English claims to the French throne =

Principal English claimants
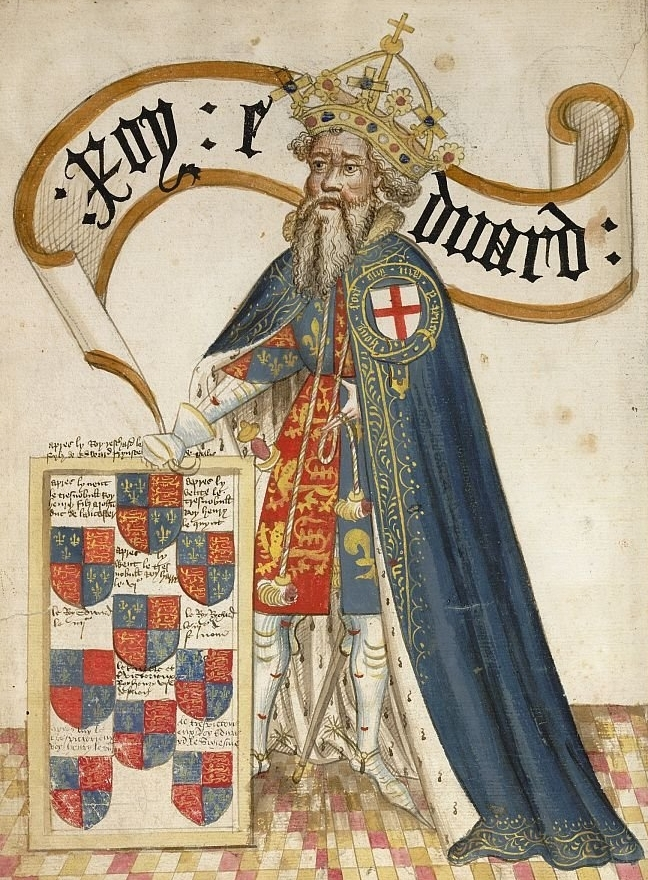
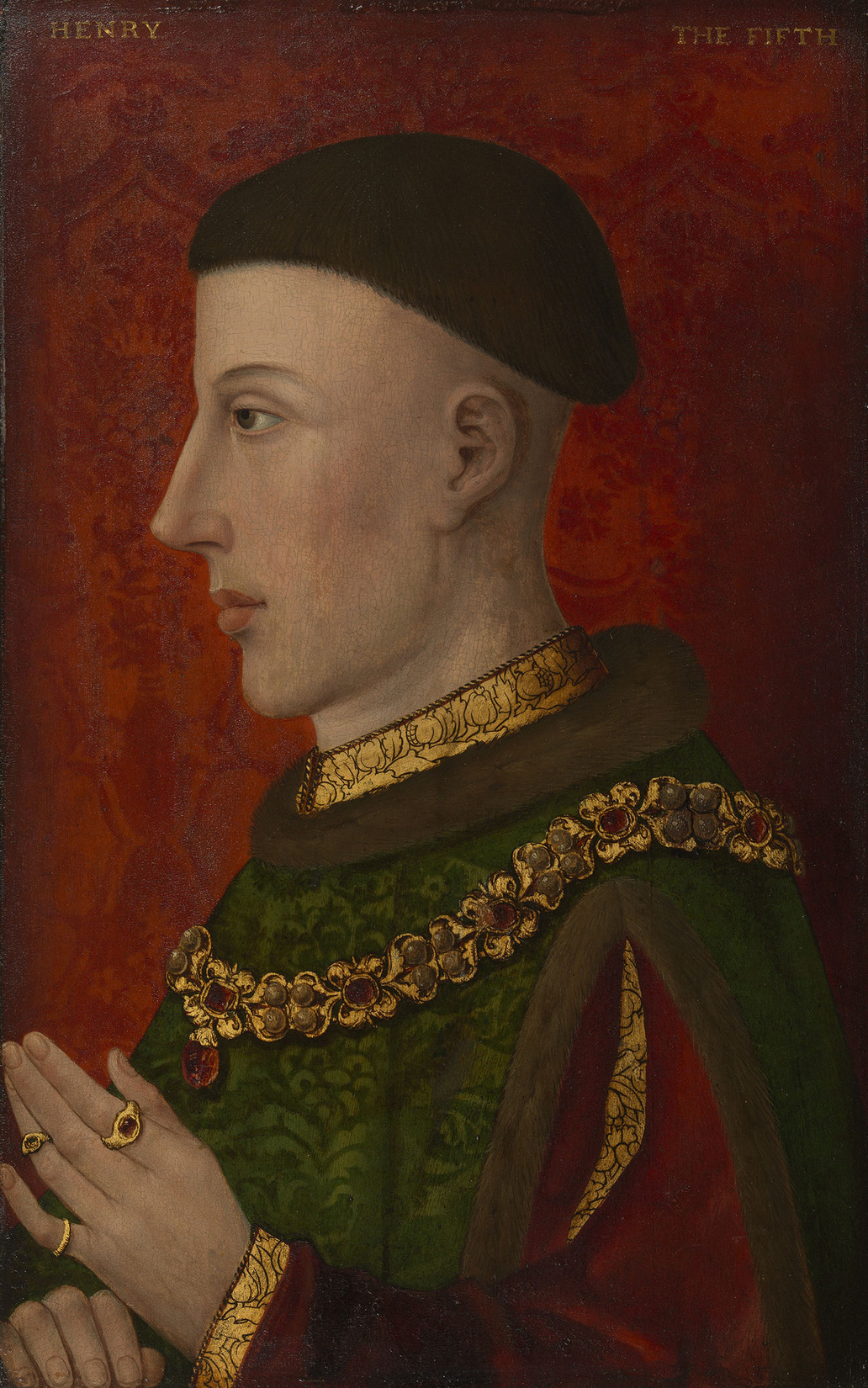
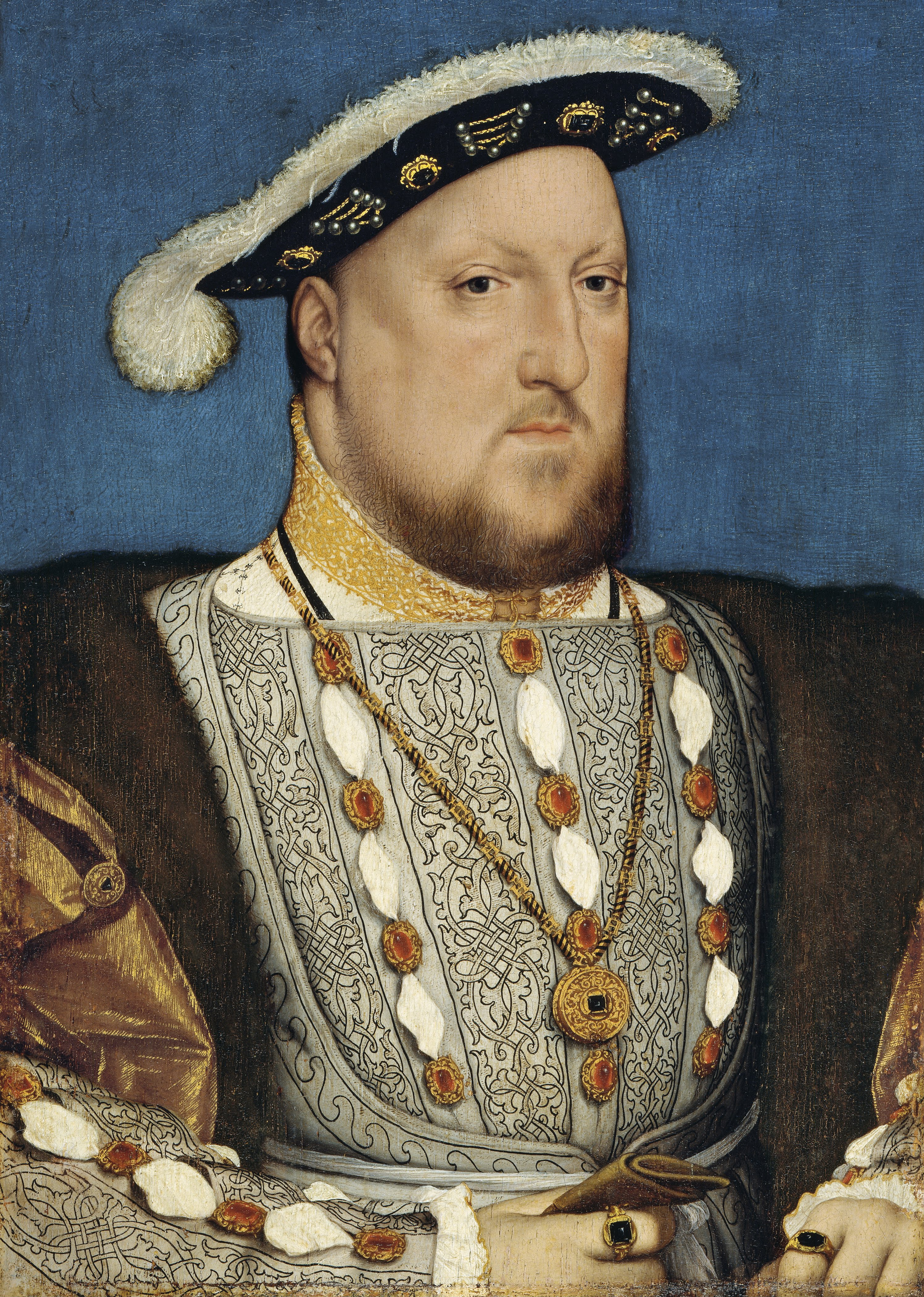
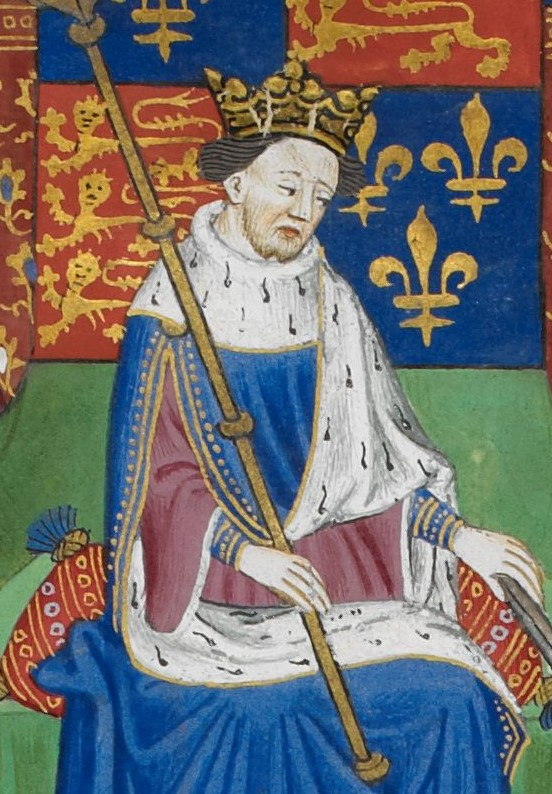
The four kings whose claims were most actively pursued, clockwise from top left: Edward III, Henry V, Henry VI and Henry VIII

From 1340, English monarchs, beginning with the Plantagenet king Edward III, asserted that they were the rightful kings of France. They fought the Hundred Years' War (1337–1453), in part, to enforce this claim, but ultimately without success. From the early 16th century, the claim had lost any realistic prospect of fulfilment, although every English and, later, British monarch, from Edward to George III, styled themselves king or queen of France until 1801.

Edward's claim was through his mother, Isabella, sister of the last direct line Capetian king of France, Charles IV. Women were excluded from inheriting the French crown and Edward was Charles's nearest male relative. On Charles's death in 1328, however, the French magnates supported Philip VI, the first king of the House of Valois, a cadet branch of the Capetian dynasty. Philip was Charles's nearest male line relative. French jurists later argued that it was a fundamental law of the kingdom that the crown could not be inherited through the female line. This was supposedly based on the 6th-century Frankish legal code known as the Salic law, although the link to the Salic law, which was tenuous in any case, was not made until the 15th century.

Edward spent much of his reign at war with the Valois kings but never secured the crown, although his main concern was to protect his French fief of Gascony. His great-grandson, Henry V, following his crushing victory at Agincourt, was able to impose the Treaty of Troyes on the French in 1420. This stipulated that he and his heirs would succeed the Valois king Charles VI on his death. Both kings died in 1422 and Henry's son, Henry VI, was crowned king of both countries, creating the so-called "dual monarchy". However, he was only recognised as king in northern France. French resistance to the dual monarchy resulted in the English being expelled from France by 1453, ending the Hundred Years' War, but leaving Calais as the last remaining English possession.

Later English invasions to win the French throne failed, the last being by Henry VIII in 1523. Calais was lost in 1558. England and France continued to fight wars but none was over the claim to the crown. The use of the title by English and, later, by British monarchs also continued but was ignored by the French, as the claim ceased to have any practical significance. However, following the French Revolution, the new republican government of France objected to the practice and the title was no longer used from 1801. The claim was finally abandoned the following year.

== Background ==
=== Anglo-French relations ===
Since the Norman Conquest English kings had held territories in France. These were extensive at the height of the "Angevin Empire" of the House of Plantagenet in the 12th century, leading to a lengthy conflict with the French monarchs. However, by the early 14th century the Plantagenet domains had been reduced to Gascony, also known as the Duchy of Aquitaine, (Note: Aquitaine, Gascony and Guyenne are frequently used interchangeably both in modern historiography and by contemporary sources. They originally had different meanings but all came to mean the territory within the Plantagenet duchy in south western France.) in south-western France and the smaller enclave of Ponthieu in the north.

France in 1328 French royal domain and French fiefs not held by king of England Lands of the "Angevin Empire" lost by English kings 1204–1327 King of England's remaining lands

Until 1259, the English kings held Gascony as allod, that is, effectively, as independent sovereign territory. By the Treaty of Paris in that year, Louis IX of France forced Henry III of England to accept a new status for the duchy as a feudal dependency of the kingdom of France. The lands were then held as a vassal of the French king for which the English king had to do him homage. The disparity between the feudal vassal–overlord relationship and the political reality of both being sovereign kings led to tension and conflict.

Contention over the political status of Gascony on two occasions resulted in war and the French king exercising his right as feudal overlord to confiscate the fief. A dispute in 1294 with Edward I over feudal rights caused Philip IV to order confiscation of the duchy, resulting in the Anglo-French Gascon War. Peace was eventually restored and the duchy returned in 1303. As part of the settlement, Edward I's son, the future Edward II, married Philip's daughter Isabella. However, another dispute and war in 1324 led Philip's son Charles IV to confiscate the duchy from his brother-in-law Edward II but it was again restored three years later.

In 1327, Edward II was deposed and his and Isabella's son, Edward III, became king of England at the age of 14. Edward III's uncle, Charles IV, died the following year.

=== Succession to the French throne ===
From the election of Hugh Capet in 987 until 1316, the French crown passed uninterrupted from father to son in the Capetian dynasty, providing, for the time, such unusual dynastic continuity that it has been called the "Capetian miracle". However, this was brought to an end by Louis X dying in 1316 and leaving only a daughter, Joan. His posthumously born son, John, died five days after birth. This created an unprecedented situation as the question of female succession to the crown had never before needed to be considered. Louis's brother, Philip, acted quickly to seize power. He set Joan aside and, after John's death, had himself crowned king, becoming Philip V. He then called an assembly of magnates to ratify his accession, which met four weeks later in early 1317. Recognising political reality, it confirmed Philip as king but, in so doing, the assembly declared "a woman could not succeed to the crown of the kingdom of France." In 1322, Philip V died leaving four daughters and no son. Consistent with the 1317 assembly's declaration, Philip's daughters were set aside by the magnates, and his brother, Charles IV, acceded to the throne.

From the 15th century, French writers began arguing that succession to the throne was, and always had been, governed by Salic law, a 6th-century Frankish legal code, which they claimed prohibited inheritance of the crown by or through a woman. They also claimed that the 1316 and 1322 successions were determined by the application of Salic law. However, Salic law had fallen into obscurity and disuse after the Carolingian era until it was rediscovered by a small group of scholars at the Abbey of St-Denis in the mid-14th century. There is no reliable evidence that Salic law played any part in the successions of 1316 or 1322 and the earliest known link made to it in connection with the succession to the throne is dated to a French treatise written around 1413. Nevertheless, allusions to this law by Jacob of Ardizone (1240) and Jean de Vignay (c. 1340), both made in reference to royal succession, suggest that there may have been an earlier awareness of it.

== Plantagenet claimants ==
=== Edward III's claim ===
Edward III and the French royal family tree, 1328 (Note: Source: Allmand 2001, p. xiv, except for the names of the daughters of Philip V and Charles IV. Names in bold are Capetian kings of France, with reign dates.)

**Philip III**; 1270–1285
**Philip IV**; 1285–1314	Charles of Valois d.1325
**Louis X** 1314–1316	**Philip V** 1316–1322	**Charles IV** 1322–1328	Isabella of France	Edward II of England	Philip of Valois (**Philip VI**)
**John I** 1316	Joan II of Navarre	Margaret, Isabella, Blanche and Joan (Note: Woodacre 2013, p. xix)	Blanche and Marie	Edward III of England	House of Valois

Notes:

The first English claim to the French throne was made by the Plantagenet king Edward III. In 1328 Charles IV of France died, leaving only a daughter, Marie; a second daughter, Blanche, was born posthumously. The successions to the French throne in 1316 and 1322 had, by this time, set the clear precedent that a woman could not succeed to the crown. Charles's closest male relative was Edward whose claim to the throne was through his mother, Isabella, Charles's sister. The English representatives in France attempted to press Edward's claim but attracted little support. The French magnates preferred Charles's next closest male relative, his cousin, Philip of Valois, a male line descendant of Charles's grandfather Philip III. Among other objections, the magnates did not want a foreign king, as they saw it, as their monarch. Edward was also still a minor and his accession might put in power his mother Isabella who was unpopular with the French nobles. (Note: Her affair with Roger Mortimer during her visit to France in 1325 was a recent scandal and had impacted her standing. She was seen as having been guilty of misconduct and had been banished from the French court.) Nevertheless, they justified their choice on the basis that "the mother had no claim, so neither did the son", according to the chronicler of Saint-Denis.

In the influential mid-15th century tract Pour ce que plusieurs, it was claimed that Philip defeated Edward's claim by citing Salic law and its supposed prohibition on inheriting the crown through a woman. This subsequently became a widely held belief. However, there is no evidence that Salic law played any part in the succession debates of 1328. In any event, Philip acceded to the throne as Philip VI, the first of the Valois kings. Although legal arguments were, no doubt, deployed in the discussions, ultimately the magnates made a political choice, the by-product of which was that the prohibition on women succeeding to the French crown was extended to men claiming the crown through a woman. Edward accepted Philip's accession and did him homage for the Duchy of Aquitaine (Gascony) in 1329.

Royal arms of England
1340–1603
Quartered with fleurs-de-lys of French royal arms, as adopted by Edward III (left) and as revised early 15th cent.

In 1337, a dispute arose between Philip and Edward regarding Edward's feudal obligations which resulted in Philip ordering the confiscation of Gascony. Edward declared war on Philip in response. In retrospect, this was seen as the opening conflict of the Hundred Years' War that lasted to 1453. While campaigning in the Low Countries in 1340, Edward made his first public declaration that he was claiming the French throne. He had consistently omitted France from his titles prior to 1340, with the exception of a small number of documents sent to his allies in France in October 1337. Indeed, prior to 1337, no one, even in England, seriously doubted that Philip VI was the rightful king of France. However, on 26 January 1340 in a ceremony in the Friday Market in the Flemish city of Ghent, Edward formally proclaimed that he was the true king of France. At the same time Edward quartered his arms—the arms of England—with the royal arms of France. His aim, at this point, was probably a tactical one, to encourage Flemish support for his struggle against Philip by supposedly giving his supporters some legal protection: that they were not technically rebelling against the French crown.

Edward's next step was to publish a written statement of his claim, and the justification for it, in a "Manifesto" issued from Ghent on 8 February 1340, "in the first year of our reign over France". The implication was that he was claiming to be king of France only from 1340 rather than from 1328. The Ghent Manifesto declared that Edward was the rightful monarch because he was "closer in blood" to Charles IV than Philip:

Since therefore the kingdom of France has devolved upon us by the clearest right owing to the death of Charles of noted memory, the last king of France, brother germane of our lady mother, and the lord Philip of Valois, son of the king's uncle, and thus farther removed in blood from the said king, has intruded himself by force into the kingdom while we were yet of tender years and holds that kingdom against God and justice ... we have recognised our right to the kingdom and have undertaken the burden of the rule of that kingdom, as we ought to do, resolving ... to cast out that usurper when opportunity shall seem most propitious.

He went on to claim he would rule in accordance with French law and on the advice of the French nobles. His aim was to restore peace to the kingdom and he had only resorted to war to defend his rights because of Philip's unreasonableness.

In November 1340, Edward delivered to Pope Benedict XII a document setting out the legal case justifying his claim. This was expanded upon in a more detailed legal brief used at a peace conference in 1344 presided over by Benedict's successor, Pope Clement VI, at the papal palace at Avignon. The legal argument put forward was that a prohibition on inheritance by a female, which was accepted as being a rule of the French succession by virtue of the decision of the 1317 assembly, did not prevent inheritance of the crown through a female. The French had claimed, vaguely, that it had been established by custom that the crown could not be inherited through females. In response, the English lawyers argued that there was no "custom and practice" to be deciphered, only the express enactments of the assemblies in 1317 and 1322. The issue in hand could not have been considered by those bodies because there were no candidates who could have claimed the crown through a female. The English also appealed to principles of Roman law which permitted inheritance through females.

One potential weakness in Edward's claim was that Louis X's daughter, Joan, had given birth in 1332 to a son, Charles of Navarre. Applying the arguments of Edward's lawyers could mean that he had priority over Edward's claim. But the case for Charles of Navarre attracted little attention or support. In 1328, Edward had been the only Capetian descendant to formally declare a counter-claim to Philip of Valois. Joan had not done so, and a retrospective claim by someone who had not been born at that time was seen as dubious.

In the legal context of the time, the arguments put forward by the English lawyers in the 1344 legal brief, while not conclusive, constituted a significant challenge to the Valois case. Clement VI attempted to reach a compromise at the conference at Avignon which involved the English setting aside the dynastic claim but Edward refused to do this and the negotiations failed. Although there are questions around Edward's sincerity in launching his claim to the French crown, he seems, at this point, to have been determined to pursue it. As the historian Mark Ormrod remarks, there are indications that he "was beginning to believe the force of his own arguments". The conference failed to result in a settlement, but the brief and the arguments put forward in it were repeatedly cited and used by the English as the basis of the Plantagenet claim throughout the Hundred Years' War.

Edward continued to use the title during the war until peace was agreed with Philip's son, John II, at the Treaty of Brétigny in 1360. Edward renounced all claims to the French throne in return for full sovereignty over Gascony and the grant of substantial additional lands in France. Edward revived his claim in 1369 in response to the attempt by John's son, Charles V, to exercise feudal rights in Gascony. In retaliation, Charles sought to confiscate Gascony, and the war resumed. The French successfully pushed the English back, and by 1375 there was little left of Edward's previously extensive territories. During the subsequent truce negotiations at the Conference of Bruges in 1375 and 1376 the English negotiators, nevertheless, refused to renounce the claim to the French throne. Edward died shortly afterwards in June 1377.

The modern consensus is that the throne of France was not the main objective of Edward's French policy. His primary concern was preserving and extending his lands in Gascony and ensuring that he had full sovereignty over them. The claim to the crown could be used as a negotiating tool to achieve that end, although, at various times, he may well have regarded securing the crown of France as a real possibility.

Edward's claim to the French throne was inherited by his grandson and successor as king of England, Richard II. The war in France continued but gradually petered out and a truce was signed in 1389. Richard pursued a policy of peace with France for the rest of his reign, but nevertheless continued to use the style king of France. He also continued to advance his grandfather's claim whenever the opportunity arose. In 1396, during failed negotiations with the French to convert the truce into a permanent peace, Richard demanded not only restoration of all Edward's lands under the Treaty of Brétigny with full sovereignty, but retention of the French title and royal arms.

=== The Lancastrians ===
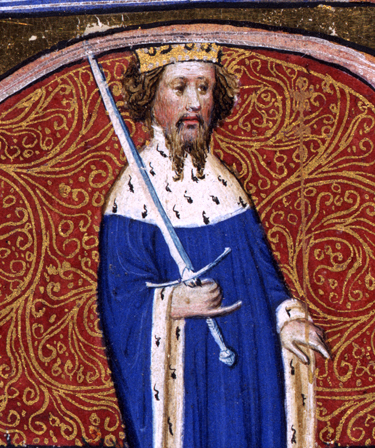
Henry IV, the first Lancastrian claimant

==== Henry IV ====
Richard was deposed in 1399 by his cousin, Henry Bolingbroke, duke of Lancaster, who, as Henry IV, became the first king of the Lancastrian branch of the House of Plantagenet. Richard died shortly afterwards, most likely murdered. As well as claiming the crown of England, Henry asserted that he was also the de jure king of France, but, as the historian Christopher Allmand has commented, he "appears to have had no burning ambition to secure the French crown". Like Richard, he followed a policy of peace with France, while, at the same time, insisting on using the style king of France. The two kingdoms were more focussed on domestic issues and the fragile truce was mostly maintained, despite intermittent breaches.

Although Henry was a grandson of Edward III, the legitimacy of his accession remained in question. If succession through a female is permitted, another descendant of Edward, Edmund Mortimer, Earl of March, had an arguably stronger claim to both the English and French crowns, (Note: Henry's father was John of Gaunt, Edward's third surviving son, whereas Mortimer was a descendant of Edward's second son, Lionel of Antwerp, albeit through Mortimer's grandmother. As such, Mortimer could be considered as having a superior claim to the throne. There was, nevertheless, not a clear answer to who was the rightful king in these circumstances. The rules of succession to the English crown, including whether descent through a female would have priority over a more junior male line descent, were far from settled at this time.) making Henry a usurper. In an attempt to override the Mortimer claim, Henry claimed the English throne as "heir male" (Note: Heir male means a male heir descended in the male line i.e. only through males. Contemporary sources differ in their account of how Henry referenced his descent from Henry III. The descriptions used include both "nearest heir male" of Henry III and "by right line of blood coming from" Henry III. Ian Mortimer believes the majority of sources reference the claim as being on the basis of "heir male" and that, in any event, "by right line of blood" also means, in practice, "heir male".) of Henry III, by-passing anyone claiming through a female.

The position in respect of the French claim was more difficult for the Lancastrians to justify. Applying the same genealogical principles that had given Edward his claim—permitting inheritance through females—would clearly mean that Mortimer, rather than Henry, was the rightful English claimant to the French crown. Furthermore, the historian Ian Mortimer has noted,

Henry IV claimed the throne of France as heir general of Philip IV (in preference to the heir male) at the same time as claiming that of England as heir male of Henry III (in preference to the heir general). He could not have it both ways, surely? Indeed, several historians—including myself—have stated that if Henry's claim to England was justified, then his claim to France was wholly spurious. (Note: However, Ian Mortimer goes on to put forward the theory that Henry claimed the throne as "heir male" of Henry III because an entail of the English crown in the male line had allegedly been proclaimed by Henry III in the 13th century, and it was still binding. While acknowledging that the terms of any such entail are not extant, he argues that it would be possible for this, if it existed, to make Henry IV's claim to the English throne not inconsistent with his claim to the French throne.)

In an attempt to resolve these issues, Henry IV had the Lancastrians' right to both crowns confirmed by an Act of Parliament in the statute 7 Henry IV, c. 2. of 1406. This aimed to embed in English law the Lancastrian right not only to the English throne but also, explicitly, to the French one as well.

==== Henry V and the dual monarchy ====
France in 1429 Recognising the dual monarchy: English or Burgundian control Burgundian domains Recognising Charles VII: "Kingdom of Bourges"

It was not until the accession of Henry V, the second Lancastrian king, in 1413 that Edward III's claim to the French crown was actively pursued again, ending the truce of 1389. Like his immediate predecessors he took the title of king of France when he came to the throne. Then, in 1414, he formally demanded from the French the crown of France. He subsequently reduced his demands, first to restoration of what had been the Angevin territories in France and later to the lands ceded to Edward III by the Treaty of Brétigny. When none of these demands were met, he invaded France in 1415.

By 1420 Henry had inflicted an overwhelming defeat on the French at Agincourt, occupied Normandy, brought the powerful Philip the Good of Burgundy over to his side and had forced on the French king, Charles VI, the Treaty of Troyes. This gave control of the French government to Henry as regent and promised him the crown. In the treaty Charles stipulated:

it is agreed that immediately after our death and thenceforward, the crown and realm of France and all their rights and appurtenances shall remain and perpetually be with our said son, King Henry and his heirs.

Thus, the dauphin, Charles's own son, also called Charles, was disinherited. Up until this point Henry had always referred to himself as king of France in all his interactions with the French. However, under the treaty, Henry instead took the title "heir (héritier) of France" in place of king of France.

For Henry V, successfully pursuing the claim to the French throne and establishing a Lancastrian "dual monarchy" of England and France had become a key objective because it would secure the prestige and position of the new Lancastrian dynasty. It was the alliance with Burgundy, which lasted until 1435, that made this a viable objective. The weakening of the Valois cause through the alliance allowed Henry to adopt a very different strategy to Edward III and ensured that the crown could remain his principal war aim. Prior to the Treaty of Troyes, it was a weakness in Henry's position that Mortimer had a stronger claim to the French crown than his own, even if the Mortimer family never asserted it. According to the historian Anne Curry, it was left deliberately ambiguous in the treaty whether the Lancastrian right to the French throne was by virtue of inheriting Edward III's claim or it was a new right specifically ceded by Charles VI as the incumbent king of France.

Although the treaty was not accepted by the dauphin or in large parts of the country, it did enable Henry, with his Burgundian allies, to take control of Paris, and most of northern France. It was also accepted and formally approved by the highest judicial authority in France, the Parlement of Paris. When Henry and Charles VI both died in 1422, Henry's infant son Henry VI succeeded to both crowns (Note: Henry V and Charles died within two months of each other. Henry's son acceded to both crowns before his first birthday. On 6 November 1429, Henry VI was crowned king of England at Westminster Abbey when he was eight years' old. His coronation as king of France took place on 16 December 1431 at Notre-Dame de Paris.) in accordance with the treaty, initiating the so-called "dual monarchy". However, the dauphin continued to dispute his exclusion from the succession and, as Charles VII, was recognised as king in the areas outside of English control south of the Loire. In practice, France was partitioned between the north under the dual monarchy and Charles VII's "kingdom of Bourges" in central and southern France.

The war continued and the Anglo-Burgundian forces initially pushed the border further south until the relief of Orléans in 1429 marked a turning point. It was, however, the defection of the Burgundians to Charles in 1435, by the Treaty of Arras, that decisively impacted the war and meant that the dual monarchy could not survive. Charles slowly drove the English northward, recovering Paris in 1436 and Normandy in 1450. By 1453, Gascony had been re-taken as well, leaving Calais and the Channel Islands as the last remaining English possessions, but bringing the Hundred Years' War to an end. Henry VI, and all his successors as monarchs of England, continued to be styled king or queen of France but it was now a title without substance.

=== The Yorkists ===
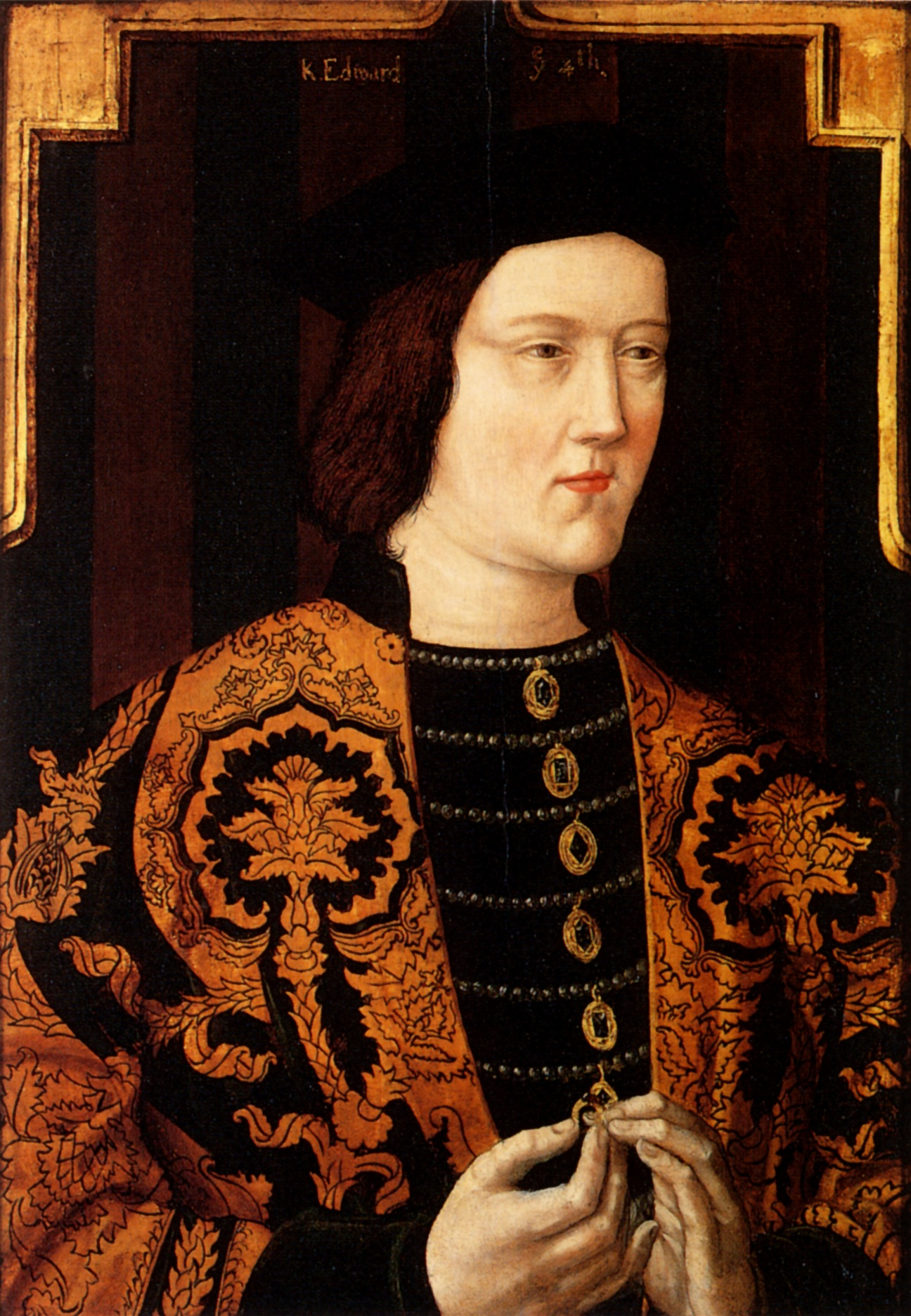
Edward IV invaded France in 1475 ostensibly to overthrow Louis XI

The humiliation of the loss of France destabilised England and was one of the causes of the civil war known as the Wars of the Roses (1455–1487), as Henry VI's Yorkist opponents held the Lancastrians responsible. In 1460, the Yorkist leader, Richard, Duke of York, attempted to depose Henry and formally submitted to Parliament his claim to both the English and French crowns. As well as being a Plantagenet and a male line descendant of Edward III, Richard was the heir of his late maternal uncle, Edmund Mortimer, 5th Earl of March, who had arguably stronger claims than the Lancastrians to both the English and French crowns.

Richard was killed in battle in 1460 before he could make good his claim to the English throne, but his son succeeded in overthrowing Henry in 1461, becoming Edward IV. However, the Lancastrians managed to briefly restore Henry to the throne in 1470 with the support of Louis XI of France. Edward recovered the throne the following year and, once he was secure, he re-asserted the claim to the French crown in response to Louis's interference.

By the Treaty of London (1474), Edward made an alliance with the Duke of Burgundy, Charles the Bold, and agreed to invade France the following year to claim the crown and overthrow Louis as a usurper. It was also agreed that, as king of France, Edward would then grant Charles full sovereignty over his domains, which would be expanded to include Champagne, leaving the rest of the kingdom to Edward. As the historian Jonathan Sumption points out, "ostensibly, these were the old war aims of Henry V. But ... his real objective was more modest." He was more interested in ensuring that a peace with France could be negotiated which enhanced the security of his position as king of England. The invasion took place in 1475, and Louis bought off Edward at the Treaty of Picquigny with a large cash payment and the promise not to support his domestic enemies. Edward then withdrew his army. Thereafter, Edward adopted a peaceful, even timid, policy towards France.

Shortly after Edward's death in 1483 his brother, Richard III, seized the throne. Richard included in his style king of France but also conceded the French kings' right to use the title. However, he adopted a generally more aggressive stance towards France than Edward had latterly, for example encouraging privateering in the English Channel. The consequence was that the French feared that he had plans to revive the Hundred Years' War and the claim to the French throne. In fact, Richard was responding to the French harbouring of the Lancastrian claimant, Henry Tudor, the future Henry VII. Richard's longer term intentions in relation to the claim to France are not known and, after a two-year reign, he was overthrown by Henry. Richard was the last Plantagenet king of England.

=== Valois rebuttals ===
Philip VI reacted furiously to Edward III's proclamation of his claim in 1340. He ordered a search of the kingdom for all copies of the Ghent Manifesto and had them destroyed. Anyone in possession of a copy was to be executed as a traitor. However, the earliest known detailed rebuttal of Edward's claim was a treatise entitled Somnium viridarii by the French jurist Évrart de Trémaugon dated 1376. This based the Valois case on the vague authority of custom. During the 14th century, Valois supporters simply asserted that by custom the French crown could not be inherited through females. As a result, Edward could not have inherited the crown and the Valois succession in 1328 was, therefore, valid. No mention was made of Salic law. The Valois kings issued royal ordinances in 1375, 1392 and 1407 regulating the succession, but without making any reference to Salic law. Each ordinance declared that the crown should pass from father to eldest son but omitted any justification for the rule of succession other than the 1407 ordinance declaring it was a "right of nature".

In response to the political crisis created by Henry V's invasion and the imposition of the dual monarchy, Valois apologists in the 15th century put forward Salic law as a more cogent argument and made it the centrepiece in the case against the English claim. It was asserted that the royal succession had always been, without interruption, subject to Salic law and it was claimed that this specified that succession to the French crown could not be by or through a woman. This provided a more compelling rebuttal than the rather vague assertions of custom, by citing a specific and uniquely French law of great antiquity with associations with Charlemagne and the origins of the nation. The first known link made to it was in a short note in a treatise written by Jean de Montreuil around 1413. His polemic in support of the Valois, A tout la chevalerie, did not focus on the Salic law argument but did include the purported text that was later widely quoted as the relevant part of the law. In reality, the text had no direct relevance to the succession to the throne (Note: The text in question was in a chapter of the law titled De alode. It dealt with private law relating to inheritance of a family's land, rather than the French throne. It also did not address the question of inheritance through a woman, that is to say cognate succession. To make it relevant to the throne, Montreuil falsified the text, which was in Latin, by adding the words "in regno" ("in the realm") to it so as to make it refer to the kingdom of France. French officials, writing in support of the Valois cause, subsequently took up the same point as Montreuil despite not being able to trace any version of the law with Montreuil's added text.) but, nevertheless, it was interpreted by the Valois apologists as being determinative.

Between 1413 and 1464, numerous tracts by French writers were published on behalf of the Valois justifying their cause on the basis of Salic law. Jean Juvénal des Ursins was the first jurist to claim directly that Philip of Valois had been chosen as king in 1328 because of Salic law. His 1446 treatise, Tres crestien, tres hault, tres puissant roy, setting out the claim, became the standard exposition of the Valois legal case. The most comprehensive exposition of the Salic law's claimed role in the French succession was a tract entitled Pour ce que plusieurs, written and published anonymously in 1464 by Guillaume Cousinot, a French royal official. It was commissioned by Louis XI to rectify perceived weaknesses in des Ursins's treatise. The tract was influential in establishing, as a central tenet of the French monarchy, the belief that Salic law had prohibited the inheritance of the French crown by or through women since ancient times. From the second half of the 15th century and into the 16th century, this interpretation and application of Salic law found support among prominent French jurists, such as Claude de Seyssel, and came to be considered as a fundamental law of the kingdom of France. This was tested in 1498 with the death of Charles VIII. Until then, the crown had passed from father to son in the direct line of the House of Valois. With Charles's death, the direct line came to an end. Demonstrating how embedded Salic law had become, his cousin and male line heir, Louis of Orléans, succeeded him as Louis XII without controversy or challenge even though over a dozen of his relatives were passed over because their relationship was through matrilineal descent.

== After the Plantagenets ==
All subsequent monarchs of England, and then Great Britain, continued to use the hollow title of king or queen of France (including in treaties with the French) until the reign of George III.

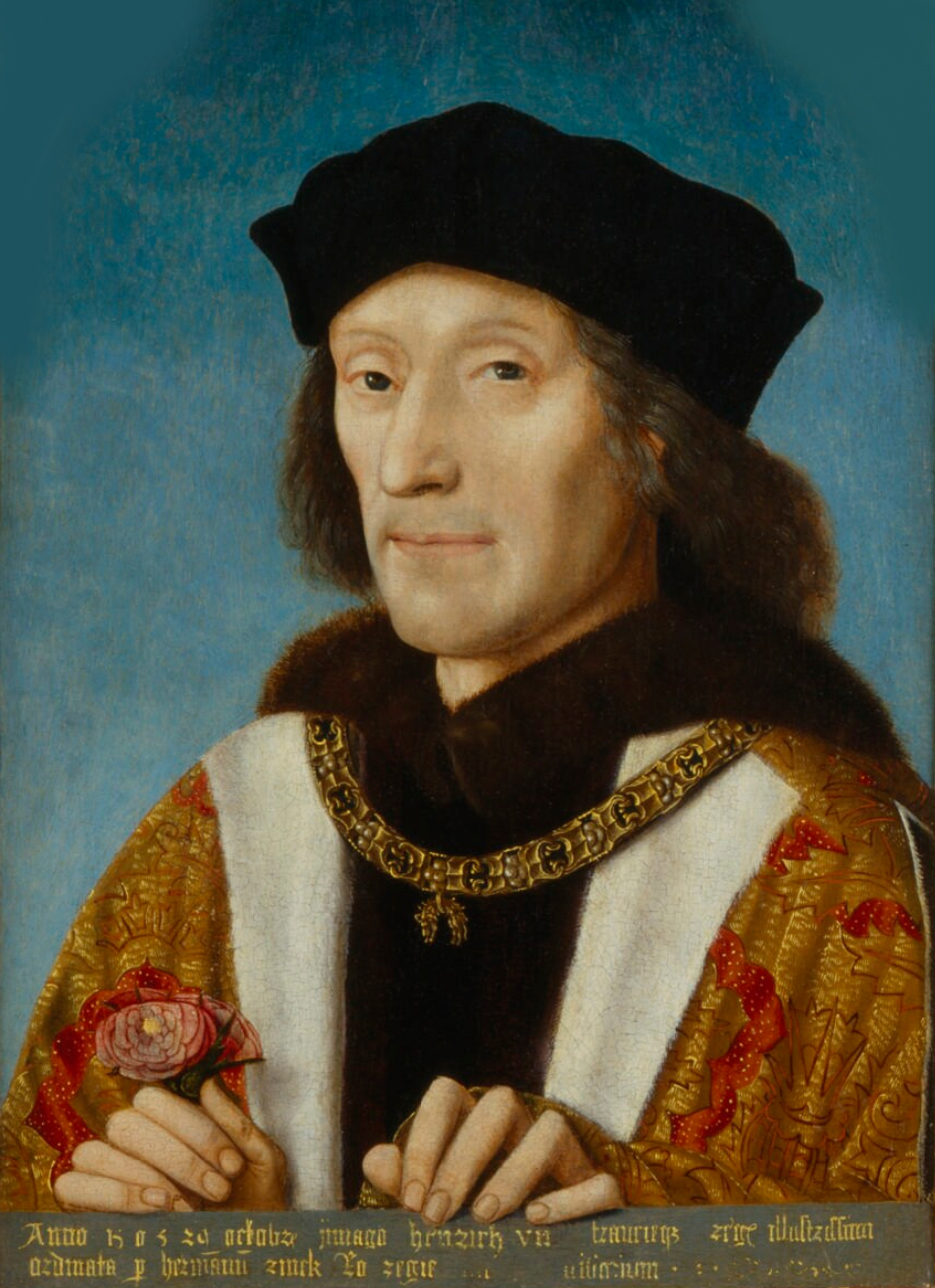
Henry VII launched an invasion of France in 1492 "for the recovering of his right there"

=== The Tudors ===
Henry VII, the first Tudor king, followed Edward IV's example. In 1489 he announced that he was claiming the French throne and made an alliance with the Breton opponents of Charles VIII. Henry invaded France in 1492 with the instruction to his army to "make his arrival within his realm of France for the recovering of his right there". However, he withdrew following the Treaty of Étaples, under which Charles agreed both to pay him a large subsidy and to cease supporting the Yorkist pretender Perkin Warbeck. By this time the claim was very much a theoretical one and primarily used for tactical purposes in negotiations with the French kings.

Henry VII's son, Henry VIII, was the last English monarch to take the claim literally and to actively pursue it, albeit by this time it was, in fact, an unrealistic objective. According to the historian Richard Marius, making good the claim to the French crown was Henry's great passion and was, for him, a "dream to grant meaning to a life that would have seemed tiresome without it". In the early part of his reign he repeatedly invaded France to claim the crown. In 1513, he even made plans to hold a coronation in Paris modelled on that of Henry VI. He believed his claim to the throne would be enthusiastically supported by the French people. In all, he invaded France three times in the decade from 1513. The only tangible outcome, however, was the occupation of Tournai for six years. Henry treated Tournai not as an English conquest but as part of his kingdom of France, and ruled it as a king of France. His last invasion aimed at taking the crown was a march on Paris in 1523, (Note: Stephen Gunn characterised it as "the boldest and most penetrating invasion of France by the English since the reign of Henry V". The Duke of Suffolk marched out of Calais with an English army and advanced to within 80 kilometres (50 mi) of Paris. When support from English allies failed to materialise Suffolk withdrew to Calais.) which the historian Stephen Gunn calls "in effect, the last campaign of the Hundred Years' War".

The anticipated support of the French people to his claim never emerged and Henry lost interest in pursuing it. As early as 1520, Henry declared, during his summit meeting with Francis I of France known as the Field of the Cloth of Gold, that it was "a title given to me which is good for nothing". Henry finally gave up pressing his claim when the Holy Roman Emperor, Charles V, made no effort to secure for him the crown after defeating and capturing Francis in 1525 at the Battle of Pavia. Despite the Emperor being Henry's ally, Charles had simply ignored Henry's demands that his claim should form part of the peace negotiations leading to Francis's release. In 1544 Henry attempted a final invasion, but the objective was limited to the conquest and colonisation of the Boulonnais; he had given up on any aspiration to claim the throne. During the campaign he seized Boulogne, the occupation of which was very different to the occupation of Tournai. Henry attached it, as a colony, to the kingdom of England rather than ruling it as a king of France. Boulogne was evacuated in 1550 and in 1558, Calais, the last remaining English possession in mainland France, was lost as well. Henry's daughter, Elizabeth I, attempted an invasion of France in the 1560s but her objectives were to support the Huguenots and to take Le Havre to swap it for Calais, rather than the crown. England would continue to fight multiple wars with France, but none involved the claim to the French throne.

=== Later use of the title ===
Royal arms 1603 – 19th cent.
Clockwise from top left: arms of the Stuarts; of William III; of the Hanoverians to 1801; and, with the French arms removed, of George III after 1801

The title nevertheless continued to be used by English and British monarchs for the next 250 years (Note: It was also used by pretenders to the British thrones. James Scott, Duke of Monmouth's proclamation declaring himself king, during his rebellion in 1685, asserted his claim to "our title to the crowns of England, Scotland, France and Ireland". The Jacobite pretenders claimed the title as well. During the Jacobite rising of 1745, military commissions were issued in the name of the Old Pretender as "King of Scotland, England, France and Ireland". The proclamations issued during the rising named his son, Charles Edward Stuart, "Regent of Scotland, England, France and Ireland". The unreal nature of the claim to the French title was emphasised by the irony of the Jacobites' reliance on the support of Louis XV.) with little impact on relations between the two countries. In the immediate aftermath of the Hundred Years' War its use by the English kings had been a cause of diplomatic strain with France. Louis XI, in particular, was preoccupied with countering the claim. But this changed with the passage of time. From the time of the Tudors it was no longer seen as a practical objective. As a consequence, the title became, as William Pitt later described it, "a harmless feather, at most, in the crown of England." It was ignored by both sides as an unrealisable fantasy, even though the English continued to use it in diplomatic interactions. When Louis XIV of France concluded the Treaty of Ryswick with his arch-enemy William III of England in 1697, the French diplomats even allowed William to use the title in the text. Equally, the English did not try to challenge the French kings' use of the title.

This remained the position until the French Revolution and the subsequent revolutionary wars. In peace negotiations between Britain and France in 1797, the French strongly objected to the use of the title on the grounds that France had become a republic. The title was finally abandoned with the British recognition of the French Republic in the Treaty of Amiens of 1802. George III, had, however, pre-empted this when he took the decision in 1801 to remove the French quartering in the royal coat of arms and to drop king of France from his royal style used in the Act of Union.

== See also ==
- Dieu et mon droit ('God and my right'), the motto of the monarch of the United Kingdom
- War of the Three Henrys and Succession of Henry IV of France, the conflict Henry IV of France's accession to the French throne with English help

== Bibliography ==
- Adams, Tracy (2023). "Overview: Valois France, 1328-1498". In Andress, D. (ed.). The Routledge Handbook of French History. Taylor & Francis. pp. 96–106. doi:10.4324/9780367808471-10. ISBN 978-1-003-82398-8.
- Allmand, Christopher (2001) [1988]. The Hundred Years War: England and France at War c.1300-c.1450. Cambridge University Press. ISBN 978-0-521-31923-2.
- Arnold-Baker, Charles (2015). "Salic law". The Companion to British History. Taylor & Francis. ISBN 978-1-317-40040-0.
- Bartlett, Robert (2020). Blood Royal: Dynastic Politics in Medieval Europe. Cambridge University Press. ISBN 978-1-108-49067-2.
- Bennett, Matthew (1998). "The Century of Strife: England and the Hundred Years' War". In Hall, Simon (ed.). The Hutchinson Illustrated Encyclopedia of British History. Taylor & Francis. ISBN 978-1-135-93485-9.
- Blackmore, Robert (2020). Government and Merchant Finance in Anglo-Gascon Trade, 1300–1500. Springer International. ISBN 978-3-030-34536-5.
- Broom, Herbert; Hadley, Edward A. (2023) [1st published 1875]. Commentaries on the Laws of England. Vol. 1. Anatiposi Verlag. ISBN 978-3-382-82464-8.
- Browning, Andrew, ed. (2024). English Historical Documents. Vol. 6 1660-1714. Taylor & Francis. ISBN 978-1-04-029440-6.
- Bucholz, Robert; Key, Newton (2019). Early Modern England 1485-1714: A Narrative History. Wiley. ISBN 978-1-118-53222-5.
- Chaplais, Pierre (2003). English Diplomatic Practice in the Middle Ages. Hambledon & London (Bloomsbury). ISBN 978-0-8264-3801-0.
- Chrimes, S.B. (2013) [1st published 1936]. English Constitutional Ideas in the Fifteenth Century. Cambridge University Press. ISBN 978-1-107-68333-4.
- Coupland, R., ed. (1915). The War Speeches of William Pitt, the Younger. Clarendon Press.
- Curry, Anne (2000). "Richard II and the war with France". In Dodd, G. (ed.). The Reign of Richard II. Tempus. ISBN 978-0-7524-1797-4.
- Curry, Anne (2008). "Two kingdoms, one king: the Treaty of Troyes (1420) and the creation of a double monarchy of England and France" (PDF). In Richardson, G. (ed.). 'The Contending Kingdoms': France and England 1420–1700. Ashgate. ISBN 978-0-7546-5789-7.
- Daiches, David (1977). Scotland and the Union. J. Murray. ISBN 978-0-7195-3391-4.
- Delogu, Daisy (2008). Theorizing the Ideal Sovereign: The Rise of the French Vernacular Royal Biography. University of Toronto Press. ISBN 978-0-8020-9807-8.
- Doran, Susan (2002). Elizabeth I and Foreign Policy, 1558-1603. Taylor & Francis. ISBN 978-1-134-74120-5.
- Elton, G.R. (2012) [1st published 1955 by Methuen]. England Under the Tudors. Taylor & Francis. ISBN 978-1-136-78660-0.
- Gerstenberger, Heide (2007). Impersonal Power: History and Theory of the Bourgeois State. Brill. ISBN 978-90-04-13027-2.
- Gillespie, James L. (2017). "Henry V". In Szarmach, P.E.; Tavormina, M.T.; Rosenthal, J.T. (eds.). Medieval England: An Encyclopedia. Taylor & Francis. ISBN 978-1-351-66637-4.
- Given-Wilson, Chris (2016). Henry IV. Yale University Press. ISBN 978-0-300-15420-7.
- Green, David (2007). Edward the Black Prince: Power in Medieval Europe. Pearson/Longman. ISBN 978-0-582-78481-9.
- Green, David (2013). "The Hundred Years War, colonial policy and the English lordships". In Villalon, L.J.A.; Kagay, D.J. (eds.). The Hundred Years War: Further Considerations. Brill. ISBN 978-90-04-24565-5.
- Green, David (2014). The Hundred Years War. Yale University Press. ISBN 978-0-300-13451-3.
- Griffiths, Ralph (1981). The Reign of King Henry VI: The Exercise of Royal Authority, 1422–1461. University of California Press. ISBN 978-0-520-31292-0.
- Gunn, Stephen (1986). "The Duke of Suffolk's March on Paris in 1523". The English Historical Review. 101 (400): 596–634. doi:10.1093/ehr/CI.CCCC.596.
- Hallam, Elizabeth (2014). Capetian France 987-1328. Taylor & Francis. ISBN 978-1-317-87728-8.
- Hanley, Sarah (2004). "The Salic law". In Fauré, C. (ed.). Political and Historical Encyclopedia of Women. Taylor & Francis. ISBN 978-1-135-45691-7.
- Harris, Robin (1994). Valois Guyenne: A Study of Politics, Government, and Society in Late Medieval France. Royal Historical Society. ISBN 978-0-86193-226-9.
- Hay, Denys (2016). Europe in the Fourteenth and Fifteenth Centuries. Taylor & Francis. ISBN 978-1-317-87191-0.
- Hicks, Michael (2019). Richard III. Yale University Press. ISBN 978-0-300-21429-1.
- Keen, M.H. (2004). England in the Later Middle Ages: A Political History. Taylor & Francis. ISBN 978-1-134-48303-7.
- Knecht, Robert (1994). Renaissance Warrior and Patron: The Reign of Francis I. Cambridge University Press. ISBN 978-0-521-57885-1.
- Knecht, Robert (2007). The Valois: Kings of France 1328-1589. Bloomsbury Academic. ISBN 978-1-85285-522-2.
- Le Bel, Jean (2011). The True Chronicles of Jean Le Bel, 1290-1360. Translated by Bryant, Nigel. Boydell & Brewer.
- Marius, Richard (1999). Thomas More: A Biography. Harvard University Press. ISBN 978-0-674-88525-7.
- Morillo, Stephen (2006) [1st published 1995]. "Edward III". In Kibler, W.W.; Zinn, G.A. (eds.). Medieval France: An Encyclopedia. Taylor & Francis. ISBN 978-0-8240-4444-2.
- Morris, Susan; Bosberry-Scott, Wendy; Belfield, Gervase, eds. (2019). Debrett's Peerage and Baronetage. Debrett's. ISBN 978-1-9997670-5-1.
- Mortimer, Ian (2008). The Perfect King: The Life of Edward III. Random House. ISBN 978-1-4070-6642-4.
- Mortimer, Ian (2010a). 1415: Henry V's Year of Glory. Random House. ISBN 978-1-84595-097-2.
- Mortimer, Ian (2010b). Medieval Intrigue: Decoding Royal Conspiracies. Continuum (Bloomsbury Academic). ISBN 978-1-84706-589-6.
- Mortimer, Ian (2013). The Fears of Henry IV: The Life of England's Self-Made King. Random House. ISBN 978-1-4070-6633-2.
- Murphy, Neil (2019). The Tudor Occupation of Boulogne: Conquest, Colonisation and Imperial Monarchy, 1544–1550. Cambridge University Press. ISBN 978-1-108-47201-2.
- Myers, A.R., ed. (2013). English historical documents. Vol. 4 Late medieval 1327 - 1485. Taylor & Francis Group. ISBN 978-0-415-60467-3.
- Neillands, Robin (2001). The Hundred Years War. Routledge. ISBN 978-0-415-26131-9.
- Ormrod, W. Mark (2011). Edward III. Yale University Press. ISBN 978-0-300-19408-1.
- Panton, Kenneth (2023). Historical Dictionary of the British Monarchy. Rowman & Littlefield Publishers. ISBN 978-1-5381-7577-4.
- Pittock, Murray (2016). Culloden. Oxford University Press. ISBN 978-0-19-966407-8.
- Prestwich, Michael (2005). Plantagenet England, 1225-1360. Oxford University Press. ISBN 978-0-19-822844-8.
- Rogers, Clifford J. (2016). "The Anglo-Burgundian alliance and grand strategy in the Hundred Years' War". In Mansoor, P.R.; Murray, W. (eds.). Grand Strategy and Military Alliances. Cambridge University Press. ISBN 978-1-107-13602-1.
- Saul, Nigel (2006). The Three Richards: Richard I, Richard II and Richard III. Bloomsbury Publishing. ISBN 978-0-8264-2415-0.
- Saul, Nigel (2008). Richard II. Yale University Press. ISBN 978-0-300-14905-0.
- Siepp, David J. (2018). "How to Get Rid of a King: Lawyering the Revolution of 1399". In MacMillan, C.; Smith, C. (eds.). Challenges to Authority and the Recognition of Rights: From Magna Carta to Modernity. Cambridge University Press. ISBN 978-1-108-42923-8.
- Strunck, Christina (2021). Britain and the Continent 1660‒1727: Political Crisis and Conflict Resolution in Mural Paintings at Windsor, Chelsea, Chatsworth, Hampton Court and Greenwich. De Gruyter. ISBN 978-3-11-075077-5.
- Sumption, Jonathan (1999). The Hundred Years War. Vol. 1: Trial by Battle. University of Pennsylvania Press. ISBN 978-0-8122-1655-4.
- Sumption, Jonathan (2011) [1st published 1999 by University of Pennsylvania Press]. The Hundred Years War. Vol. 2: Trial By Fire. Faber & Faber. ISBN 978-0-571-26659-3.
- Sumption, Jonathan (2025). The Hundred Years War. Vol. 5: Triumph and Illusion. Faber & Faber. ISBN 978-0-571-27459-8.
- Taylor, Craig (2001a). "The Salic Law and the Valois succession to the French crown". French History. 15 (4): 358–377. doi:10.1093/fh/15.4.358.
- Taylor, Craig (2001b). "Edward III and the Plantagenet claim to the French throne". In Bothwell, J. (ed.). The Age of Edward III. York Medieval Press. ISBN 978-1-903153-06-2.
- Taylor, Craig (2004). "'Weep thou for me in France': French views of the deposition of Richard II". In Ormrod, W. M. (ed.). Fourteenth Century England. Vol. III. Boydell Press. ISBN 978-1-84383-046-7.
- Taylor, Craig, ed. (2006). Debating the Hundred Years War: Pour Ce Que Plusieurs (La Loy Salicque) And a Declaration of the Trew and Dewe Title of Henry VIII. Cambridge University Press. ISBN 978-0-521-87390-1.
- Thomson, John A.F. (2014). The Transformation of Medieval England 1370-1529. Taylor & Francis. ISBN 978-1-317-87260-3.
- Vaughan, Richard (2002) [1st published 1973]. Charles the Bold: The Last Valois Duke of Burgundy. Boydell Press. ISBN 978-0-85115-918-8.
- Wagner, John A. (2001). "Hundred Years War". Encyclopedia of the Wars of the Roses. Bloomsbury Publishing. ISBN 978-1-57607-575-3.
- Webster, Bruce (2004). The Wars Of The Roses. Routledge. ISBN 978-1-135-36443-4.
- Whaley, Derek (2019). "From a Salic law to the Salic law: the creation and re-creation of the royal succession system of France". In Woodacre, E.; et al. (eds.). The Routledge History of Monarchy. Taylor & Francis. ISBN 978-0-367-72757-4.
- Wolffe, Bertram (2001). Henry VI. Yale University Press. ISBN 978-0-300-08926-4.
- Woodacre, Elena (2013). The Queens Regnant of Navarre: Succession, Politics, and Partnership, 1274-1512. Springer. ISBN 978-1-137-33915-7.
