= Jean de Liège =

French sculptor

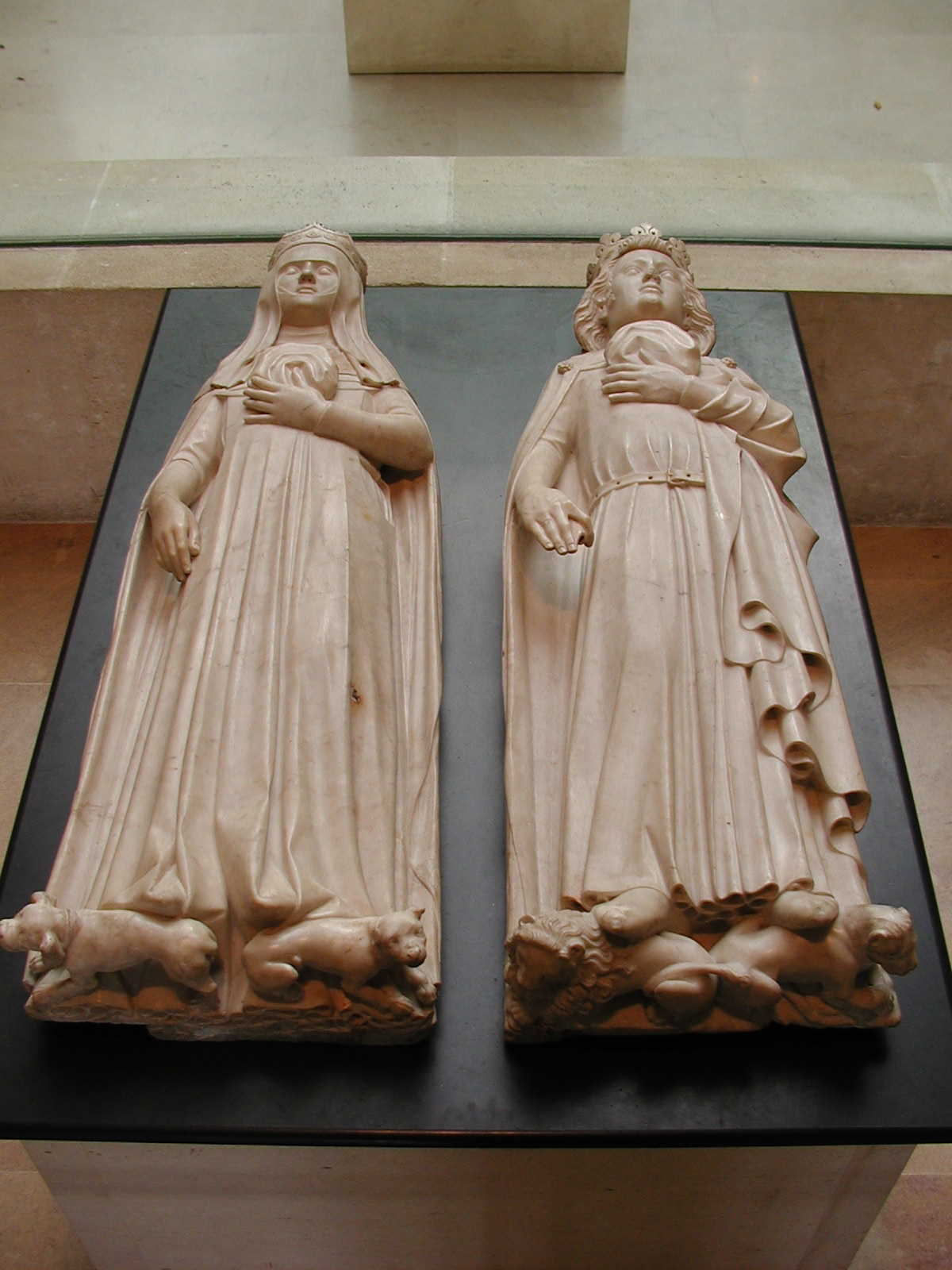
Effigies of Jeanne d'Évreux and Charles IV of France sculpted by Jean de Liège. From the Maubuisson Abbey, now in The Louvre, 1372

Jean de Liège, (c.1330-1381) was a 14th-century sculptor of Flemish origin, mainly active in France, who specialized in funerary sculptures.

Little is known of Jean de Liège's life except through his works. These include the Tomb of Queen Philippa of Hainault made for Westminster Abbey in 1366, the Tomb of the heart of Charles V for the Rouen Cathedral in 1368, and the Tomb of the entrails of Charles IV and Jeanne d'Évreux in 1372 for the Maubuisson Abbey, now residing in The Louvre. The Louvre also retains his portraits of Charles V and Joanna of Bourbon (1365).

An inventory of his works drawn up after his death records other sculptures: Annunciation, Gésine Notre-Dame and Tomb of the Duchess of Orleans and her sister. The recumbent Blanche of France (1328-1394) kept at Saint-Denis and Marie de France are destroyed, except the bust found at the Metropolitan Museum of Art. On the basis of these certified works, other works have been attributed to him, including the Lying Joanna of Bourbon, Lying of Margaret of Flanders, Lying of an unknown princess, and the Musée de Cluny has sculptures of Presentation of Jesus at the Temple and St. John the Evangelist which are in the manner of Jean de Liège as well and may be attributed to him.
