= Maubuisson Abbey =

Former abbey and royal palace in France

- Abbaye de Maubuisson
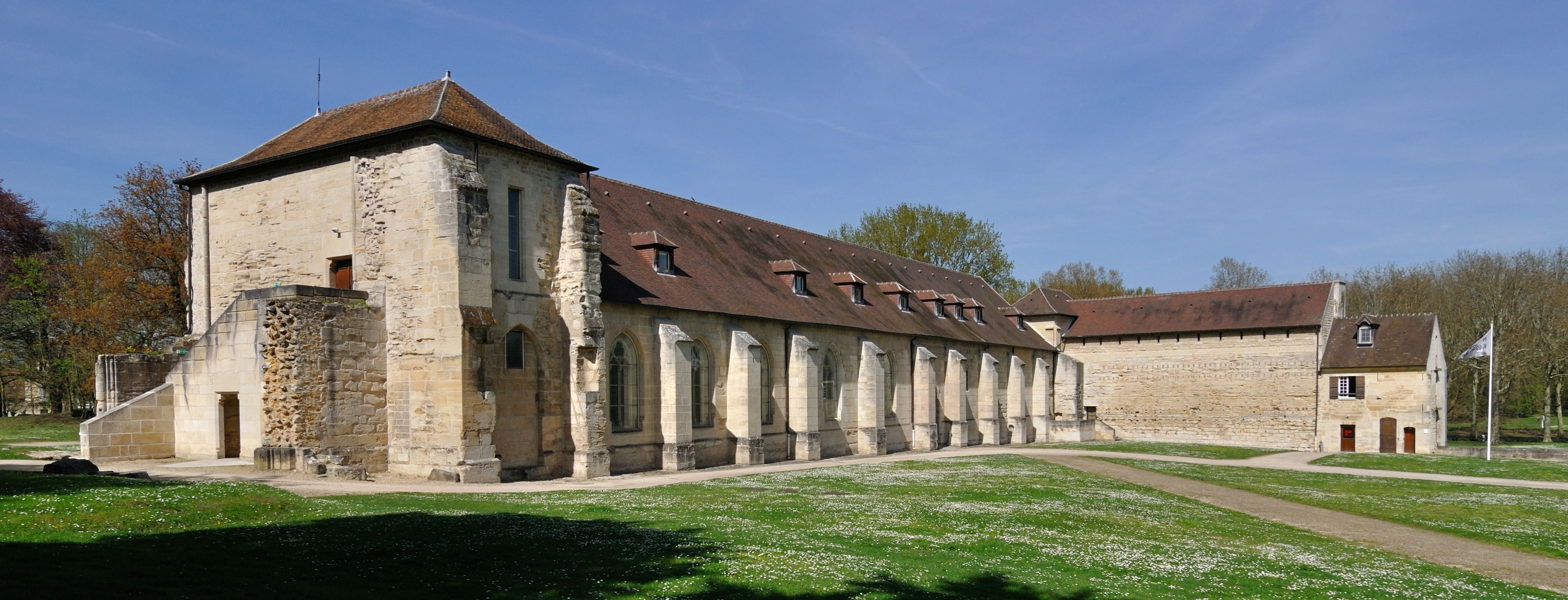
- The southeastern side of the abbey

- Location within Île-de-France (region)

Religion
- Sect: Ancient Order of Cistercians
- Region: Île-de-France, France

Location
- Location: Saint-Ouen-l'Aumône, Val-d'Oise
- Interactive map of Maubuisson Abbey
- Coordinates: 49°02′46″N 2°07′00″E

Architecture
- Style: Cistercian architecture
- Groundbreaking: 1241

Website
- valdoise.fr

Maubuisson Abbey (French: Abbaye de Maubuisson or Notre-Dame-la-Royale) is a Cistercian nunnery at Saint-Ouen-l'Aumône, in the Val-d'Oise department of France. It was founded in A.D. 1236 by Blanche of Castile, Queen of France, who may have been buried there in 1252. The site is now within the north-western suburbs of Paris. The surviving buildings are listed as a monument historique.

== History ==
The abbey was founded in 1236 by Blanche of Castile, the queen consort of Louis VIII. It thrived financially under royal patronage until the Hundred Years' War.

In the fifteenth century the nuns twice supported rival abbesses.

After a century of decline the abbey was disbanded in 1787 by order of Louis XVI.

=== From foundation to the Hundred Years War ===
As part of an effort to strengthen the ties between royalty and the abbeys, Blanche of Castile decided to finance and build her own abbey. In 1236 she annexed the lands of Pontoise and Saint-Ouen, which only became Saint-Ouen-l'Aumône much later. These lands had the advantage of being close to the castle at Pontoise, at the confluence of the River Oise and the Liesse stream.

She built Maubuisson Abbey between the villages of Saint-Ouen and Épluches, on the left bank of the Oise. According to local legend, the name "Maubuisson" was translated from Latin as French: Maudit buisson ("Cursed bush"), because of the prevalence of bandits in the surrounding woodland. However, this story is not confirmed by local archaeologists researching Saint-Ouen-l'Aumône archives.

The abbey's enclosure of land covered 32 hectares (79 acres).

To breathe life into the abbey, from 1237 until 1242 Blanche of Castile devoted herself to a chapter of the Cistercians, and in 1242 she installed, in barely-finished buildings, a group of nuns from Saint-Antoine near Paris. She named the abbey "Notre-Dame-la-Royale", in honour of the Virgin Mary, patron saint of the Kingdom of France, but the name "Maubuisson" has been used from the start.

After the groundbreaking in 1241, it became attached to the Order of Cistercians in 1244. Because of its royal connections it was well protected, and played an important role in the local economy.

Blanche of Castile gave the Abbey three well-defined roles:

1. As a gathering-place for young noblewomen
2. As a royal residence
3. As a royal necropolis: Bonne of Luxembourg was interred there; her son Charles V had his own tomb built; and in 1599 Gabrielle d'Estrées was interred in the chapel choir.

In 1307, King Philip IV of France annihilated the Knights Templar, to whom he was deeply indebted. On 14 September 1307 – the day of celebration of the True Cross – he issued the order for the trials of the Knights Templar from the abbey.

From 5 to 8 September 1463, while touring the villes de la Somme, King Louis XI (born 1423; reigned 1461–1483) stayed at Pontoise, and awarded Royal protection to Maubuisson Abbey by means of Letters Patent, doing so again in December 1474.

The abbey's robust budget let it survive the Hundred Years' War.

=== From 16th to 18th centuries ===
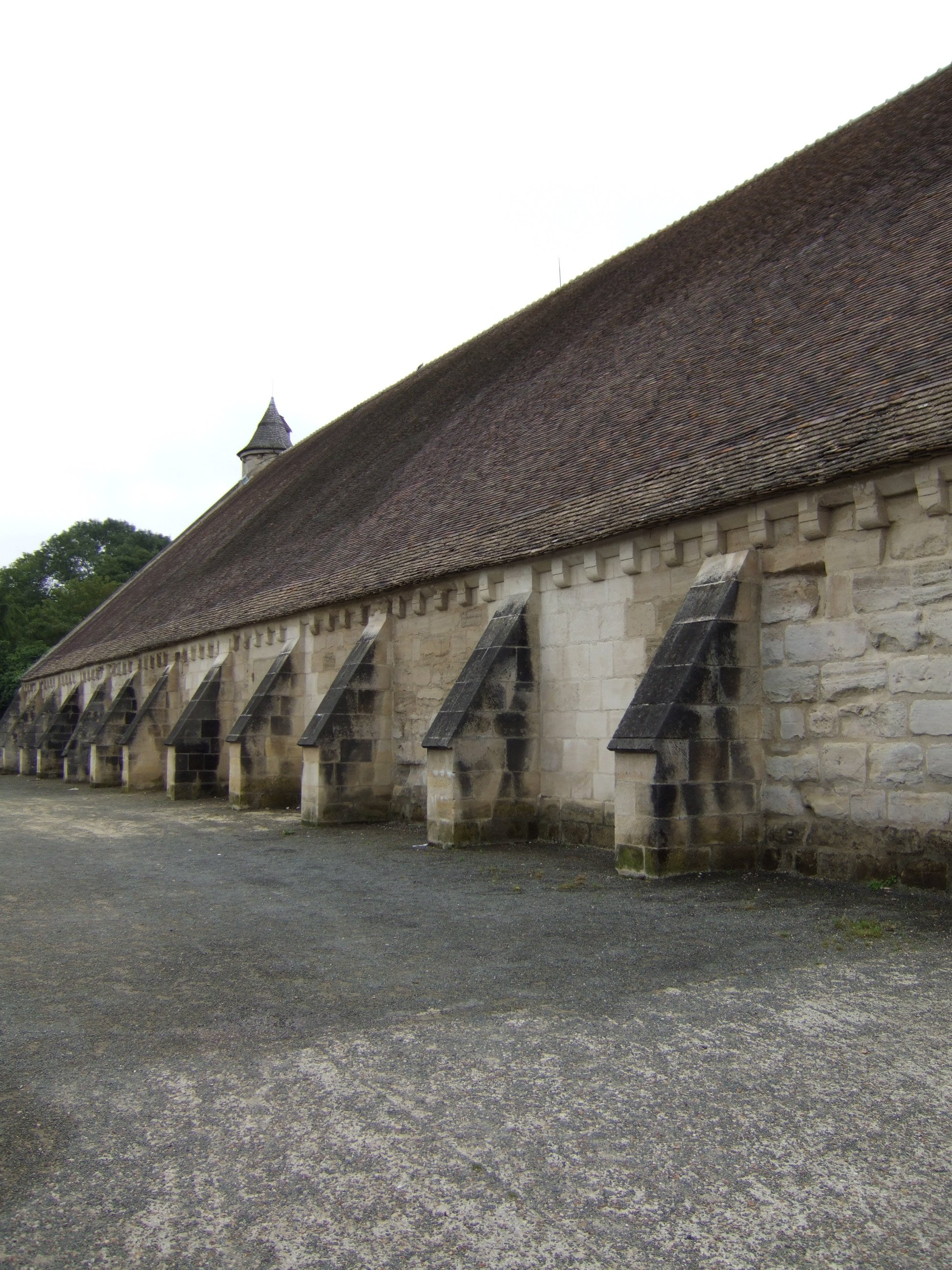
The tithe barn on the northwest side of the Abbey

At the start of the 16th century, under the auspices of Abbess Antoinette de Dinteville (1482 – 1523), new wings were constructed and the abbey numbered 120 nuns. However, it was a trying time as the French Wars of Religion progressed: at least twice, in 1566 and 1588, the abbey and its associated land and buildings were ransacked by Protestant troops.

In 1597, Angélique d'Estrées, sister of Gabrielle d'Estrées, was appointed Mother Superior of the Royal Abbey by Henri IV. The abbey's doctrine diverged from that of the Rule of Saint Benedict and the spirit of Saint Bernard. The French: vicaire général of the Cistercians gave Angélique Arnauld orders to leave the Abbey of Port-Royal des Champs and go to reform that at Maubuisson. She found d'Estrées and her entourage troublesome. With the intervention of the Parlement of Paris, the prévôt of Île-de-France removed them, and installed Arnauld as abbess. François de Sales made several visits to the new abbess.

Later, Arnauld was replaced by Madame de Soissons, but, in Racine's words, she:

...n'avoit pas pris un fort grand soin d'y entretenir la régularité que la Mère Angélique y avoit établie
...did not take a great effort to keep the routine that Mother Angélique had put in place

— Jean Racine

de Soissons died in 1627. Her successor Marie Suireau, known as Marie des Anges ("Mary of the Angels"), was chosen (on Arnauld's proposal) as Maubuisson's leader, a position she held until 1648. From 1628, she fought against the influence of Molinism on some of the sisters, but with two nuns suspected of this heresy having been ejected, the orthodoxy and canons of the Cistercian Order were affirmed.

Louise Hollandine of the Palatinate (1622 – 1709), daughter of Frederick V of the Palatinate and aunt of Elizabeth Charlotte of Bavaria, second sister-in-law of Louis XIV, also served as Abbess of Maubuisson.

On 27 April 1769, Archbishop Christophe de Beaumont, the Duke of Saint-Cloud, visited the abbey to restore friendly relations between the abbess and her nuns.

In the 18th century, the abbey shrank in numbers, from 70 nuns in 1720 to only 18 in 1780. In 1786, Louis XVI decided to disband it.

Before the French Revolution, the Abbess earned around 5,000 livres in tithes.

== Abbesses ==
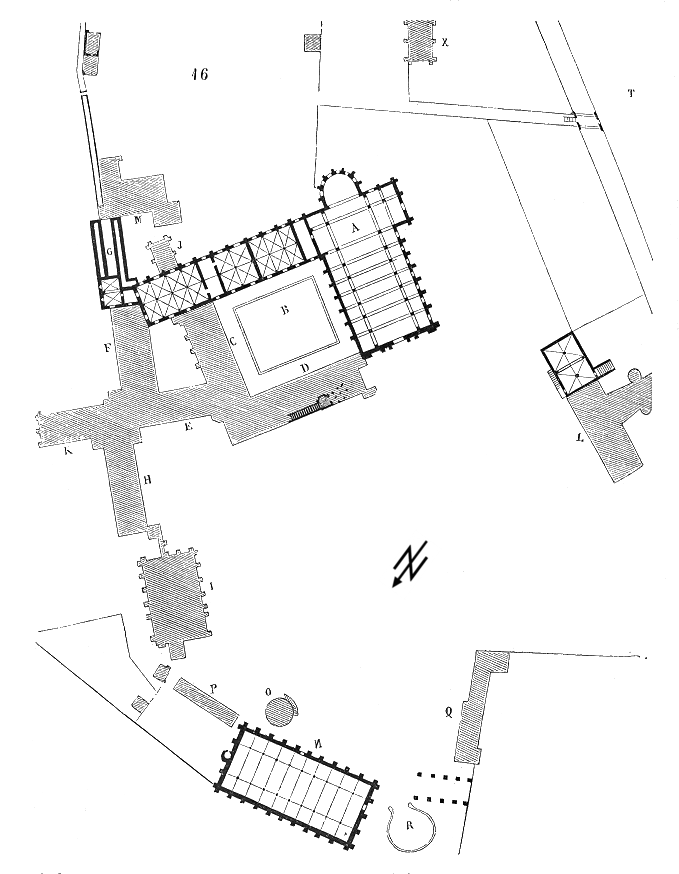
Plan of the abbey, from the Dictionnaire raisonné de l’architecture française by Eugène Viollet-le-Duc (1856). In grey, buildings partially or wholly demolished.

Year from	Year to	Abbess
1242	1275	Guillemette I
1275	1276	Agnès de Laval
1276	1309	Blanche de Brienne d'Eu
1309	1345	Isabelle de Montmorency
1345	1362	Marguerite I de Moncy
1362	1390	Philippa Paynel of Hambye
1390	1391	Catherine I of Flins
1391	1406	Jeanne d'Ivry
1406	1456	Catherine II of Estouteville
1456	1461	Madeleine I
1461	1473	Marguerite II Danes
1473	1482	Guillemette II Martine
1482	1523	Antoinette of Dinteville des Chenets
1523	1524	Henriette de Villers la Faye
1524	1543	Mary of Montmorency
1543	1546	Mary II of Annebault
1546	1574	Mary III of Pisseleu d'Heilly
1574	1594	Madeleine II Tiercelin of Brosses
1594	1597	Françoise Tiercelin de Brosses
1597	1618	Angélique d'Estrées
1618	1621	Interim of the Abbess of Port-Royal des Champs
1623	1626	Charlotte I of Bourbon-Soissons
1626	1648	Mary IV Suireau of Rocheren
1648	1652	Suzanne of Hénin-Liétard de Roches
1652	1653	Marguerite III of Béthune of Orval
1653	1664	Catherine III Angélique of Valois-Orléans-Longueville
1664	1709	Louise Hollandine of the Palatinate
1709	1719	Charlotte II Joubert of the Bastide of Chateaumorand
1719	1765	Charlotte III of Colbert-Croissy
1765	1766	Mary V Margaret of Jarente of Senas d'Orgeval
1766	1780	Venture-Gabrielle of Pontevès of Maubousquet
1780	1786	Gabrielle-Césarine of Beynac

=== After the Revolution ===
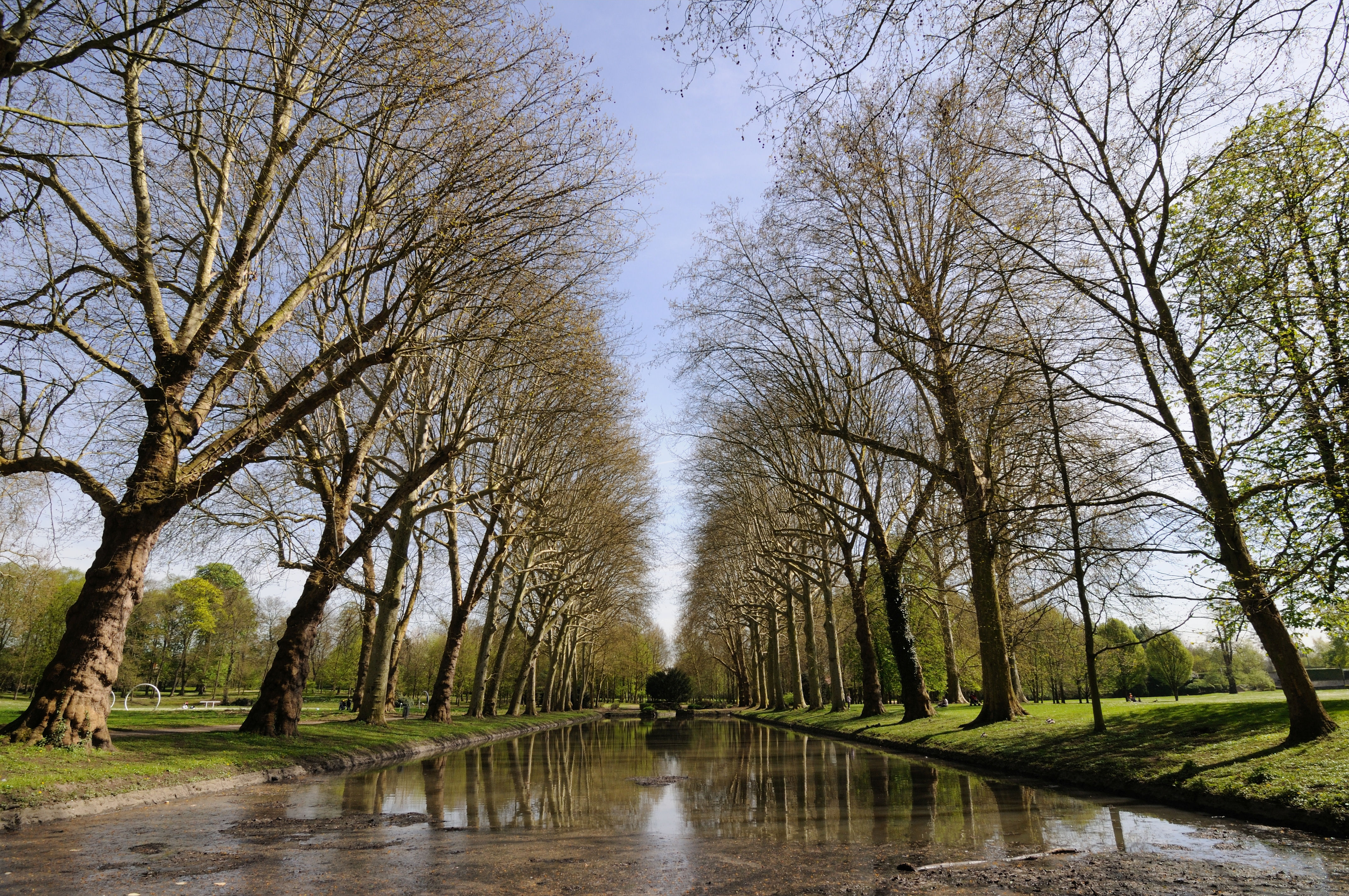
An avenue of sycamores in the abbey's grounds

In 1786, Louis XVI decreed that the abbey had lost its religious function, and the French Revolution only entrenched that view. In 1793 it became a military hospital, and then served as a stone quarry at the start of the 19th century. Such buildings as were still useful by the mid-19th century either became part of a textile mill or were closed.

In 1947 the abbey was classed as a monument historique, and became the property of the Departmental Council of Val-d'Oise in 1979. For two years, until 1981, there were some exploratory archaeological digs, followed by important restorative works, in particular to the tower of the tithe barn.

==== Centre of Contemporary Arts ====
As of 2018, the abbey houses a Centre of Contemporary Arts which stages exhibitions. Since 2001, it has specialised in plastic and visual art. Artists are invited based on their relevance and newsworthiness, but also for their capacity to explore a space of such unique heritage.

Large specialist exhibitions take place each year, lasting from two to eight months. They are dedicated to the production of original works and reflect the richness and diversity of contemporary installation art, video, photography, sculpture, painting, digital arts, sound, and so on. The abbey is a project incubator lab: all year, it develops research, production and direction programmes along the three axes which make up its identity: architectural heritage, contemporary works, and natural history.

The abbey takes part in Tram (Contemporary Art), a federated network of contemporary art producers in Île-de-France, which facilitates dialogue between art practitioners.

== Description ==
=== Notre-Dame-La-Royale ===
According to the writings of Noel Tallepied, dated 1584, the abbey church was an extremely tall building:

il possédait deux ailes et un petit clocher pour remplacer un plus imposant détruit en 1540 par un incendie déclenché par la foudre
It had two wings and a small bell-tower, which burnt down in 1540 when struck by lightning

Grilles and woodwork separated the cloisters from the nunnery. The high altar was adorned with a white marble altarpiece, donated by Jeanne d'Évreux in 1340. It was demolished during the French Revolution. The centrepiece, a relief of the Last Supper, is preserved at the Saint-Joseph-des-Carmes church in Paris. Other features include a reliquary of the Madonna and Child, situated near the side altar. Dating from the 16th century, it is 140 cm (4 ft 7 in) tall, carved from walnut, painted and gilded. The Virgin Mary is sitting, holding the infant Jesus on her knee. This forms the middle of a triptych composed of three hollow parts, each subdivided into boxes with wooden columns and statuettes representing Paradise, Hell, Purgatory and scenes from the Old and New Testaments.

In 1792, the nuns entrusted it to their groundkeeper, and in 1839, it was given to the church of Saint-Ouen in Saint-Ouen-l'Aumône. It had lost its original statuettes, that of the Twelve Apostles at Calvary being replaced around 1840. It was classified as historical monument on 13 May 1897 and stolen on 13 April 1973.

=== Burials ===
Until the end of the 15th century, the church served as a necropolis for royalty and nobility, as well as for the abbesses who are buried there. There are five burial grounds within the abbey:

Abbey church

This was reserved for the Royal Family and others of high class.

- 1252: Blanche of Castile During the 1907 excavations, many precious objects were found which mysteriously vanished without trace.
- 1320: Jeanne de la Marche (daughter of Charles IV of France and Blanche of Burgundy), buried in a black marble tomb on a white marble base.
- 1271: Alphonse de Poitiers (1220–1271), burial of his remains.
- 1275: Marie of Brienne (1225-1275)
- 1296: Jean de Brienne (died 1296), court butler, son of Jean de Brienne. Buried in the choir.
- 1302: Robert II d'Artois (1250-1302), buried in the choir.
- 1307: Catherine of Courtenay.
- 1309: Blanche de Brienne (1276-13 July 1309), abbess, buried in the nuns' small winter choir.
- 1326: Blanche of Burgundy, died in the abbey on 29 April, buried in the choir.
- 1328: Charles IV of France (1294-1328), died 1 February, his remains were buried in the choir to the right of the high altar, before the first pillar.
- 1328: Marguerite de Beaumont, died 9 April, daughter of Louis de Brienne and Agnès de Beaumont-au-Maine. She married Bohemond VII of Antioch in Naples on 2 January 1278
- 1329: Mahaut, Countess of Artois (1269 or 1270–1329), died 27 November and buried in the choir.
- 1349: Bonne of Luxembourg (1315-1349), died 11 September, reburied with his son Charles V of France on his death in 1380, to the left of the altar in a space in front of the nuns' small winter choir.
- c. 1351: Philippe de Montmorency, to the left of the nave before the second pillar.
- 1371: Jeanne d'Évreux, together with her husband Charles IV.
- 1390: Jeanne de France (1388-1390), eldest daughter of Charles VI of France and Isabel of Bavaria.
- 1390: Philippa of Paynel, abbess, to the left of the nave before the second pillar.

In April 1599, the body of Gabrielle d'Estrées was interred in the choir by her sister Angelique, then abbess, together with her child.

The remains of Charles IV, husband of Blanche of Burgundy, and his second daughterJeanne d'Évreux (1372), in recumbent works by Jean de Liège, are at the Louvre in Paris.

Chapel, east and south wings

These are dedicated to the nobility and bourgeoisie. The tomb of the first abbess is also located here.

- Guillemette I governed the abbey for nearly thirty years and was named as "Saint Guillemette". She feigned being a cousin of Louis IX of France and niece of Blanche of Castile, but her mother is unknown. She converted large numbers of people, and is attributed with performing miracles both in life and after death. Her tomb and epitaph are very modest.

Cloister and gallery adjoining the boarding-house

These are dedicated to the burial of active and retired nuns.

Abbey cemetery

This was dedicated to nuns. It was razed in the 17th century to make room for the cloister gallery.

Saint-Michel church and its cemetery

This small church is located to the south-west of the abbey church, and the graveyard is dedicated to the abbey's benefactors, be they laity, priests, religious or other servants.

- On 25 October 1766 Abbot Grassis, priest from the diocese of Lizieux and royal chaplain of Maubuisson, was buried here.

=== Cloisters ===
The cloisters were enclosed by the abbey church, the chapel (built over the dormitory), the boilerhouse, the kitchen and the refectory, which were all enlarged.

=== Latrines ===
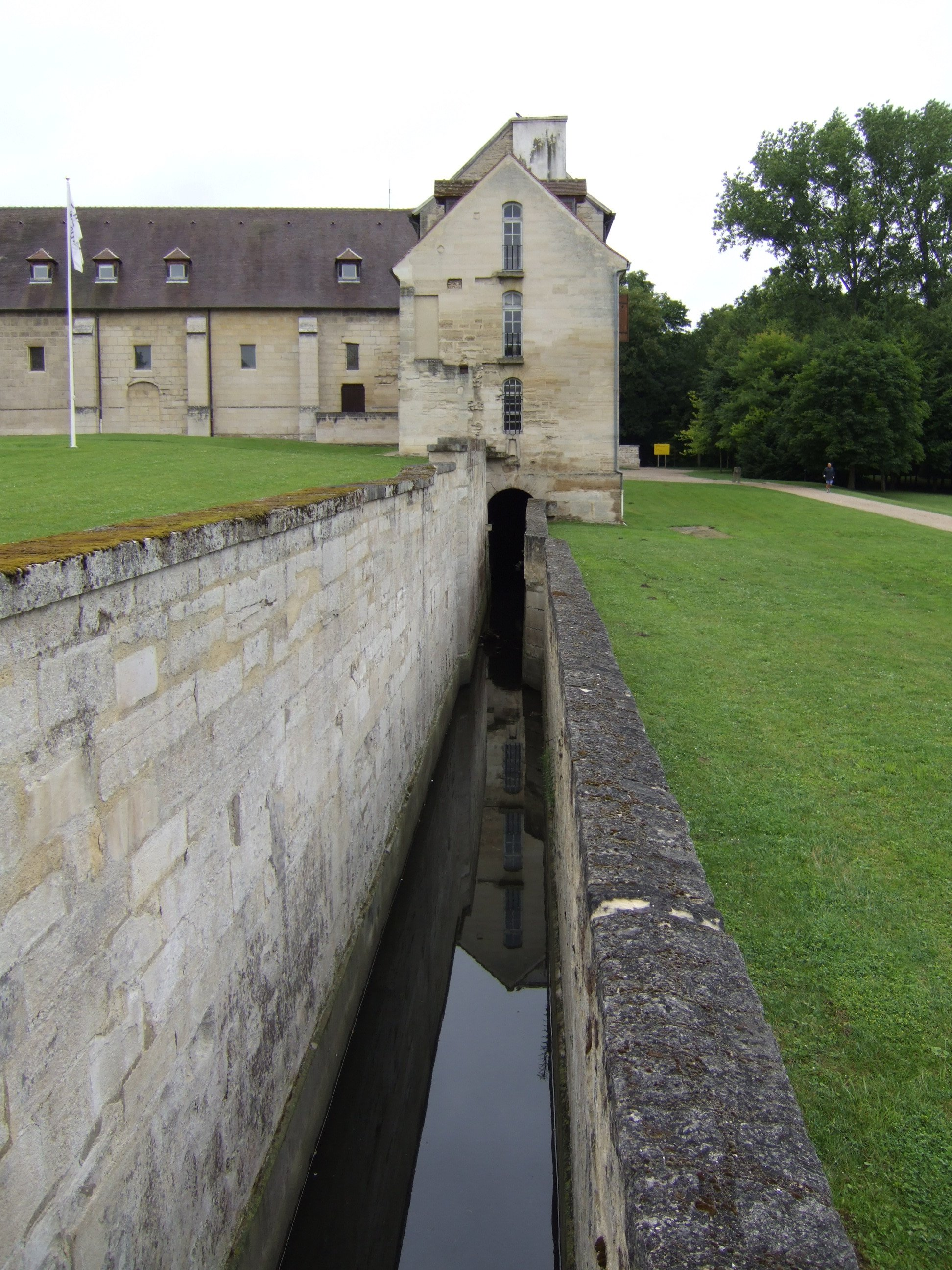
Latrine outhouse and drainage channel

As with all mediaeval abbeys, Maubuisson was built with a complex system of plumbing. The presence of two nearby watercourses would have influenced Blanche of Castile's decision to site the abbey there. Drainage channels serviced the latrines and also let the water be reused to turn the mill.

The latrines, built over a drainage channel, consisted of 38 back-to-back seats. The whole was enclosed by a 20-arched roof, 14 m (46 ft) high.

=== Chauffoir ===
This and the refectory no longer exist. The chauffoir was the only place where hot food could be cooked.

=== Parlour ===
This was the only place where nuns could talk directly with the Mother Superior. They could speak only of spiritual and material matters related to their religious community.

=== Chapter ===
The chapter was a room in which, every day, the nuns would take confession from the abbess or her deputy, and listen to a sermon of Saint Benedict, to whom the room was dedicated. The Mother Superior would then discuss the sermon. The nuns could also discuss it, together with matters concerning the community: sales and purchases, contracts, and so on.
