= Château de Brie-Comte-Robert =

Castle in Seine-et-Marne département, France

Coordinates: 48.6925°N 2.6108°E

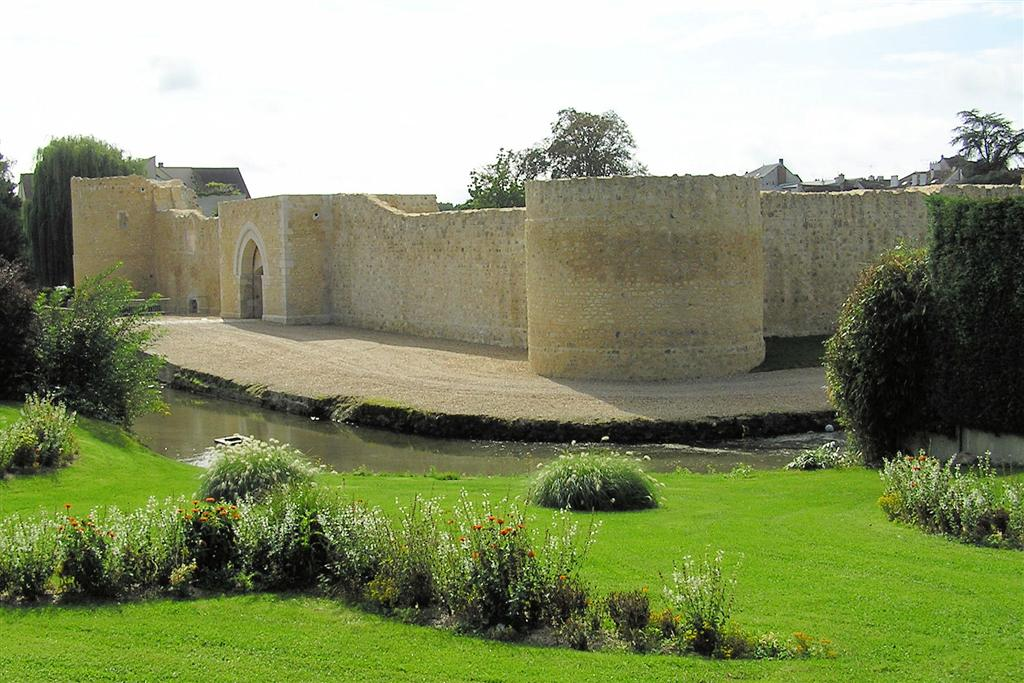
View of the castle

The Château de Brie-Comte-Robert is a castle in the town of Brie-Comte-Robert in the Seine-et-Marne département of France.

== History ==
=== 12th - 13th centuries ===
The castle of Brie-Comte-Robert was built at the end of the 12th century, when Robert I of Dreux, brother of the king Louis VII, was lord of Brie. Archaeological clues, elements of decoration and the choice of construction techniques, suggest the architecture of this turning point in history.

=== 14th century ===
The castle remained in the Dreux family until 1254, then passed to the family of Châtillon. Through successive dowries and inheritances, it came to Marguerite d'Artois and then her daughter, Jeanne d'Évreux.

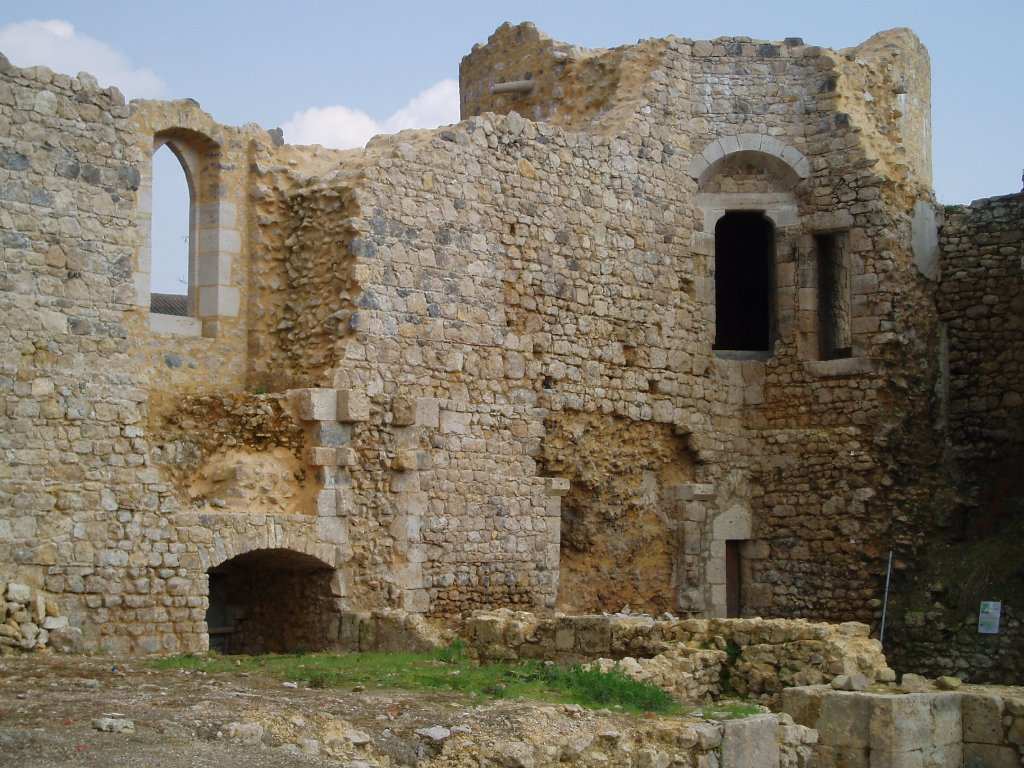
Below this tower was the residence

Jeanne d'Évreux, who held the manor of Brie-Count-Robert by inheritance, became the wife of the last Capetian king, Charles IV the Fair. After his death in 1328, she profited from comfortable revenues (a royal dower of many fiefdoms in Brie and Champagne), which enabled her to devote important sums to the maintenance and the improvement of her own possessions, including Brie-Comte-Robert. She did important work to the castle, as her accounts preserved at the Archives Nationales (national archives) attest.

The castle became a prestigious residence which the large lords of the kingdom, in particular the dukes of Burgundy, did not hesitate to visit. It was also the site, in 1349, of the marriage of Philip VI of Valois and Blanche d'Évreux, niece of queen Jeanne.

The lady of Brie made the seigneurial residence luxurious, particularly in the area located against the south-western and south-eastern curtains and, above all, in the north-east. She had a chapel built dedicated to Saint-Denis, joined to the Tour Saint-Jean (St John Tower), and laid out vast pleasure gardens. Jeanne d'Évreux died in the castle in 1371, aged 69.

At the end of the 14th century, the castle returned into the royal domain, then later to the Orléans family.

=== 15th century ===
Louis I de Valois, Duke of Orléans led a sparkling life at the castle of Brie-Count-Robert (tournaments, receptions of great nobles), but, faced with growing insecurity, he strengthened the castle from 1405. Following his assassination by John the Fearless, duke of Burgundy, and the founding of the Armagnac Party in 1407, the castle passed under the control of the Burgundian Party, thus securing it as a safe stage on the road from Paris towards Burgundy.

In 1420, the passage of the English army, en route to Troyes, and the siege of Melun which followed, brought some disorder to the town, but did not affect the castle. It is from 1429 that the city was, « par quatre diverses fois en trois ans », ("four separate times in three years"), taken and retaken by the French and the English. The major event remains however the siege begun in September 1430 by the Humphrey Stafford, 1st Duke of Buckingham, who caused immense damage, in the town as well as to the castle. The place was repurchased by the French in 1434 and was returned to its rightful owner, Charles of Orléans. His son, the future king Louis XII, placed the castle in the royal domain.

=== 16th century ===
Starting from the reign of Francis I, the castle and its grounds were entrusted by the king to some of his close associates, either by way of favour (« don pour un temps » - "gift for a time"), or by conditional sale with option of repurchase (« l'engagement »). Among them were, notably: Louis Poncher, Philippe de Chabot, the marshal Jean Caraccioli, Balthazar Goblin and Claude de Bullion, superintendent of the finances of Louis XIII.

In the middle of the century, various families of Italian lords, close to Catherine de' Medici (Aquaviva, Pierrevive, Gondi), held the castle, but allowed the building to deteriorate, even causing the burning of the floors and some frames.

A 1567 law passed by the Parliament was needed to put an end to this damage. At the end of the century, Balthazar Goblin, follower of Henri IV, made repairs to the castle.

The castle was still in a position to receive the young Louis XIII twice, in 1609 and 1611.

=== 17th century ===
In 1649, at the time of the Fronde disorders, the town and the castle of Brie-Comte-Robert, were taken by the royal troops commanded by the count de Grancey. The castle was cannonaded by a battery for more than five hours, losing its south-eastern tower.

Later repairs had to be very modest: in 1681, the castle was regarded as "... uninhabitable, the ditches full of rubbish, the garden fallow..." (« inhabitable, les fossés comblés d'immondices, le jardin en friche... »).

Jean-Antoine de Mesmes, first President of the parlement of Paris carried out various maintenance works on the roofs and repairs to the access bridges. Legal documents from this period describe some internal developments. The castle was then inhabited by private individuals.

=== 18th century ===
In 1750, Germain-Louis de Chauvelin, lord since 1734, asserting the dilapidation of the building, obtained authorisation to reduce the towers and the curtains to the level of the first floor, excepting however the Saint-Jean tower, the manorial symbol.

Repurchased by the king Louis XV in 1766, the manor of Brie-Count-Robert, including the castle, was the subject of an exchange between Louis and his cousin, Louis Charles de Bourbon, Count of Eu. His heirs, the duke of Penthièvre, and then his daughter, the duchess of Orléans, were the last lords.

During the French Revolution, the building was used to imprison Pierre Victor, Baron de Besenval de Brunstatt, colonel of the Swiss Guards and military commander of the Île-de-France. The building was later sold as national property.

=== 19th and 20th centuries ===
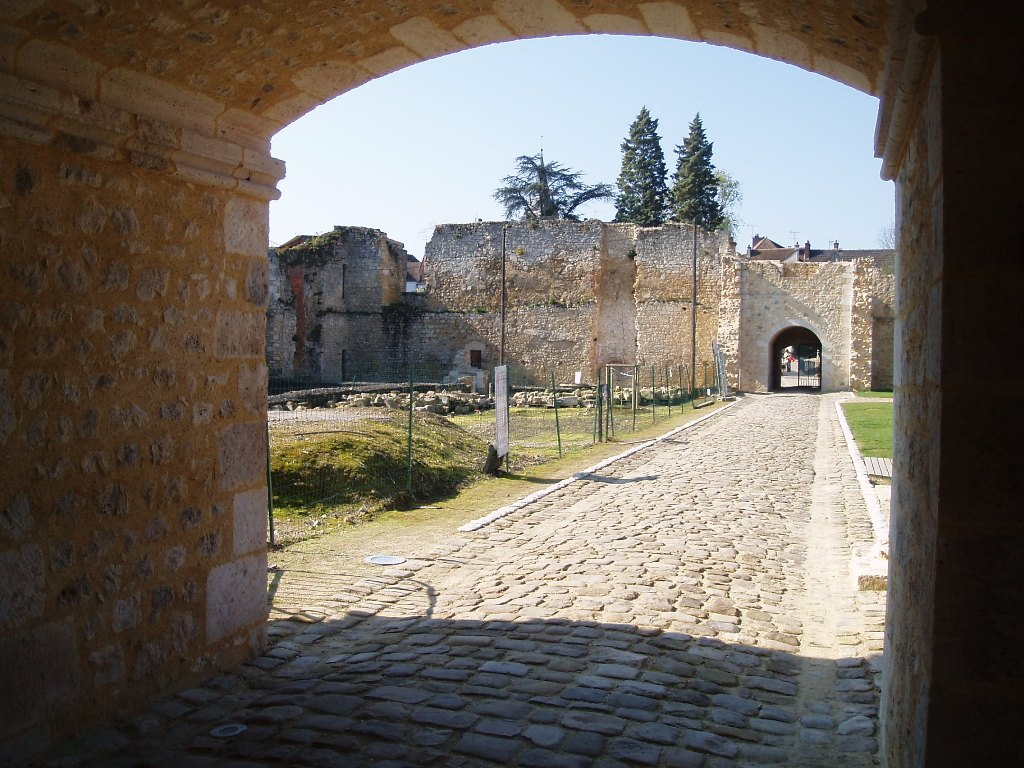
Castle courtyard, seen from the northern entrance

Repurchased by the town in 1803, the castle was sold again in 1813. In 1879, one of the successive private owners during this period unfortunately razed what remained of the Tour Saint-Jean, to build a modern house.

Massive topsoil deposits transformed the court and the jousting yard into a vast vegetable garden. The commune repurchased the castle in 1923 and it was classified as a monument historique in 1925.

From 1982, the municipality undertook a programme to repair the site, including archaeological works. These have guided the later restoration programme of the castle's remains.

== Today ==
2003 saw the beginning of a grand programme of restoration of the castle, with the rebuilding of curtains to a height more than six metres, the restoration of the Tour de Brie, and the demolition of the 19th century house in the courtyard, allowing the partial rebuilding of the Tour Saint-Jean, according to archaeological documents.

Inside the enclosure, the construction of a modern building, the Centre d'Interprétation du Patrimoine (Heritage Interpretation Centre), allows the Association des Amis du Vieux Château (Friends of the Old Château Association) to design and present a permanent exhibition of the site and to undertake teaching activities.

== See also ==
List of castles in France
