= Marie of France (1326–1341) =

French princess, daughter of Charles IV

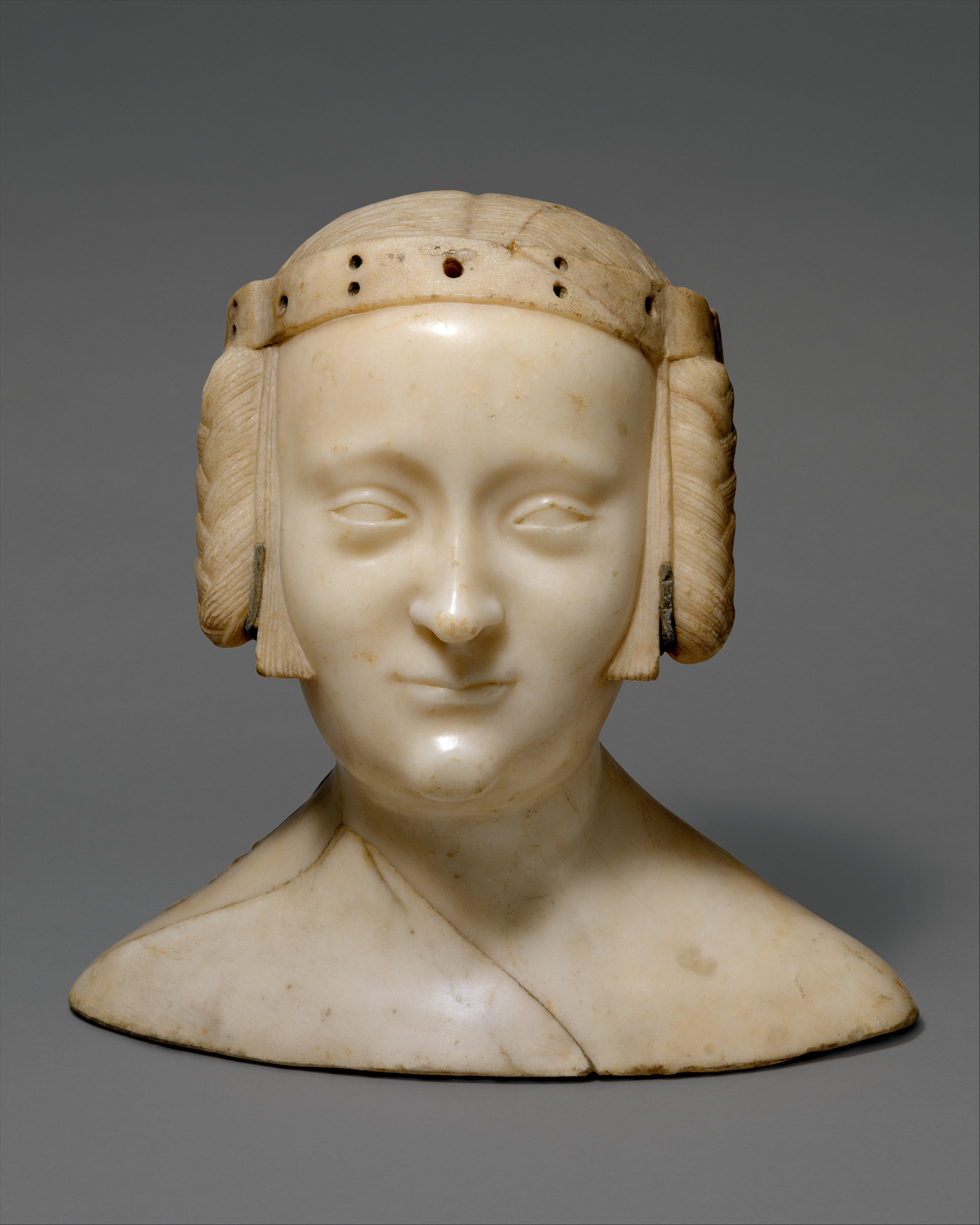
- Tomb effigy by Jean de Liège, c. 1381, now housed at the Metropolitan Museum of Art
- Born: October 1326; Château-Thierry, Champagne
- Died: 6 October 1341 (aged ~15)
- Burial: Basilica of Saint-Denis (until 1793)
- House: Capet
- Father: Charles IV of France
- Mother: Joan of Évreux

Marie of France (October 1326 – 6 October 1341) was a Capetian princess and daughter of King Charles IV of France and his third wife, Joan of Évreux.

== Biography ==
Marie was the second daughter of Charles IV the Fair, king of France and Navarre, and his third wife, Joan of Évreux. She was born in Château-Thierry shortly after 18 October 1326. The continuators of the Chronicle of Guillaume de Nangis specify that her elder sister Joan died shortly after her birth, between November 1326 and 16 January 1327. When King Charles died on 1 February 1328, Queen Joan was pregnant for the third time. The birth of a daughter, Blanche, two months later sealed the end of the rule of the direct Capetians by virtue of the exclusion of women from succession to the throne of France, formalized much later as the Salic law. This prevented Charles IV's two surviving daughters from claiming the throne.

Thus, the deceased king's closest male relative in terms of agnatic primogeniture was his cousin Philip of Valois who ascended the throne as Philip VI. Despite Philip's accession, Queen Joan claimed the throne of Navarre for her two daughters. It had been assigned by Louis X to his daughter, another Joan. She had been excluded from the succession to it by her uncles Philip V and Charles IV who favoured the claims of Joan of Évreux. In order to extinguish Joan of Évreux's claims, Louis's daughter proposed in June 1328 to buy out her cousins' claims to Navarre for an annual subsidy of 5,000 livres tournois. The negotiations dragged on, however, because Joan of Évreux demanded 6,000 livres. It was still unresolved when Marie died prematurely in Paris on 6 October, 1341 at the age of fourteen.

== Tomb and effigy ==
After her death, Marie was buried next to her father in the royal necropolis of the Basilica of Saint-Denis. Her tomb, completed by the sculptor Jean de Liège around 1381, was located in the chapel of the north transept. Marie was depicted wearing a crown that encircled the lead-encrusted band surrounding her head, while a canopy decorated with fleurs-de-lis overlooked her recumbent figure. (François Roger de Gaignières depicted the recumbent figure of Marie in a 17th - century drawing, but without her crown or her hands joined in prayer, perhaps destroyed during the French Wars of Religion the previous century.) The tombs of Marie and her sister Blanche were desecrated on 19 October 1793 by the revolutionaries. However, the bust of the recumbent figure was spared and recovered two years later by the medievalist Alexandre Lenoir. During the Bourbon Restoration in France in 1816, the latter returned it to Louis XVIII, who placed it in the Basilica of Saint-Denis. The bust was then presented in the collection of Pierre Dufay in Paris in 1900, before disappearing and reemerging in the 1920s in the collection of George and Florence Blumenthal in New York City. Since George Blumenthal's death in 1941, it has been kept at the Metropolitan Museum of Art in New York.

== Bibliography and websites ==
- Bodleian Libraries, Oxford (2025). "MS. Gough Drawings Gaignières 2 - Drawing No. 39: tomb effigies of Marie and Blanche, daughters of Charles IV". Digital Bodleian.
- de Guibours, Anselm (1726) [1st published 1674]. Genealogical and chronological history of the Royal House of France, of the peers, great officers of the Crown and of the King's House, and of the ancient barons of the kingdom. Vol. 1. Compagnie des Libraires associés.
- MOMA, New York (2025). "Tomb Effigy Bust of Marie de France (1327-41), daughter of Charles IV of France and Jeanne d'Evreux". The Metropolitan Museum of Art.
- Stasser, Thierry (1993). "The third marriage of King Charles IV of France and his offspring". Medieval Prosopography. 14 (2): 1–26. ISSN 0198-9405. JSTOR 44946157.
- Sumption, Jonathan (1999). The Hundred Years War. Vol. 1: Trial by Battle. University of Pennsylvania Press. ISBN 978-0-8122-1655-4.
- Surget, Marie-Laure (2006). "Blanche de France, première duchesse d'Orléans (1328-1393)". Bulletin de la Société archéologique et historique de l'Orléanais. 2. 18 147: 37–58. ISSN 0337-579X.
- Taylor, Craig (2001). "The Salic Law and the Valois succession to the French crown". French History. 15 (4): 358–377. doi:10.1093/fh/15.4.358.
- Taylor, Craig, ed. (2006). Debating the Hundred Years War: Pour Ce Que Plusieurs (La Loy Salicque) And a Declaration of the Trew and Dewe Title of Henry VIII. Cambridge University Press. ISBN 978-0-521-87390-1.
