= Joan of Évreux =

Queen of France and Navarre from 1322 to 1328

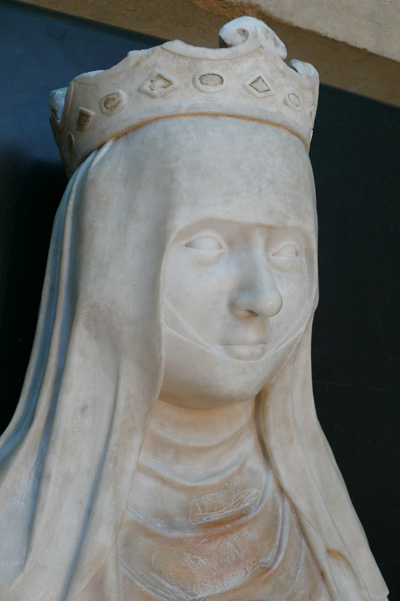
- Tomb effigy, 1372

Queen consort of France and Navarre
- Tenure: 5 July 1324 – 1 February 1328
- Coronation: 11 May 1326
- Born: 1310
- Died: 4 March 1371 (aged 60–61); Château de Brie-Comte-Robert, Brie-Comte-Robert, France
- Burial: Basilica of St Denis, France
- Spouse: Charles IV of France (m. 1324; died 1328)
- Issue: Joan of France; Marie of France; Blanche, Duchess of Orléans
- House: Évreux
- Father: Louis, Count of Évreux
- Mother: Margaret of Artois

Joan of Évreux (French: Jeanne d'Évreux; 1310 – 4 March 1371) was Queen of France and Navarre as the third wife of King Charles IV of France.

== Life ==
She was the daughter of Louis, Count of Évreux and Margaret of Artois. Because Joan was Charles's first cousin, the couple required papal permission to marry, which they obtained from Pope John XXII. They had three daughters, Jeanne, Marie and Blanche, who were unable to inherit the throne under principles of Salic law. The royal couple's lack of sons caused the end of the direct line of the Capetian dynasty.

Joan died on 4 March 1371 in her château at Brie-Comte-Robert, in the Île-de-France region, some twenty miles southeast of Paris. She was buried at the Basilica of St Denis, the necropolis of the Kings of France.

== Legacy ==
Two of Joan's remarkable possessions survive: her book of hours and a statue of the Virgin and Child. The Book of Hours, known as the Hours of Jeanne d'Evreux, is in The Cloisters collection of the Metropolitan Museum of Art in New York. It was commissioned from the artist Jean Pucelle between 1324 and 1328, probably as a gift from her husband. The book contains the usual prayers of the canonical hours as arranged for the laity along with the notable inclusion of the office dedicated to St Louis, her great-grandfather. The small statue of the Virgin and Child (gilded silver and enamel, 69 cm high), which Jeanne left to the monastery of St Denis outside Paris, is in the Louvre Museum.

== Sources ==
- d'Avray, David (2015). Papacy, Monarchy and Marriage 860–1600. Cambridge University Press.
- Benton, Janetta Rebold (2009). Materials, Methods, and Masterpieces of Medieval Art. Praeger Publishers.
- Keane, Marguerite (2016). Material Culture and Queenship in 14th-century France: The Testament of Blanche of Navarre (1331-1398). Brill.
- Pernoud, Regine; Clin, Narue-Veronique (1999). Wheeler, Bonnie (ed.). Joan of Arc: Her Story. Translated by Adams, Jeremy duQuesnay. St. Martin's Press.
- Suger (2018). Selected Works of Abbot Suger of Saint Denis. Catholic University of America Press.
- Warner, Kathryn (2017). Isabella of France: The Rebel Queen. Amberley Publishing.
- Woodacre, Elena (2013). The Queens Regnant of Navarre: Succession, Politics, and Partnerships, 1274-1512. Palgrave Macmillan.

Joan of Évreux House of Évreux Cadet branch of the Capetian dynasty Born: 1310 Died: 4 March 1371
French royalty
Vacant Title last held by Marie of Luxembourg	Queen consort of Navarre; 1324–1328	Vacant Title next held by Joan of France
Vacant Title last held by Marie of Luxembourg	Queen consort of France; 1324–1328	Vacant Title next held by Joan of Burgundy
