= Blanche of France, Duchess of Orléans =

French princess (1328–1393)

Blanche of France
- Duchess of Orléans
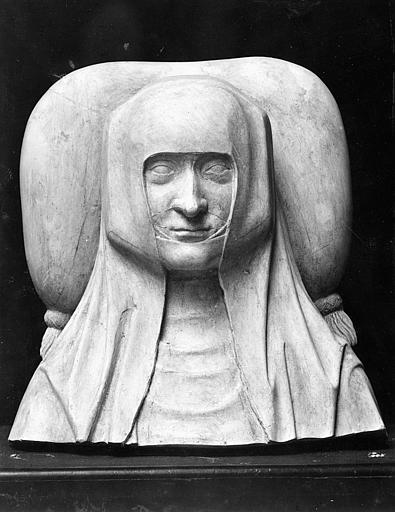
- Tomb bust of Blanche at the Basilica of Saint-Denis
- Born: 1 April 1328
- Died: 8 February 1393 (aged 64)
- Burial: Basilica of St Denis
- Spouse: Philip, Duke of Orléans (m. 1345; died 1376)
- House: House of Capet
- Father: Charles IV of France
- Mother: Jeanne of Évreux

Blanche of France (1 April 1328 – 8 February 1393) was the posthumous daughter of King Charles IV of France and his third wife, Joan of Évreux (the daughter of Louis, Count of Évreux and Margaret of Artois). She was the last direct Capetian and the last-surviving member of her family, and her marriage to her second cousin, Philip, Duke of Orléans, proved childless. With Blanche's death in 1393, the House of Capet continued to exist only via its numerous cadet branches.

== Succession ==
As with his brothers before him, King Charles IV died without a male heir, thus ending the direct line of the House of Capet. Twelve years earlier, a rule against succession by females, arguably derived from the Salic law, had been recognized as controlling succession to the French throne. Application of this rule barred Charles's 1-year-old daughter Marie from succeeding as the monarch.

Jeanne was also pregnant at the time of his death. Since it was possible that she would give birth to a son, a regency was set up under Philip of Valois, the closest agnate. After two months, Queen Jeanne gave birth to Blanche. The regent thus became king and in May was consecrated and crowned. At this time, a further rule of succession, again arguably based on the Salic law, was recognized as forbidding not only inheritance by a woman, but also inheritance through a female line.

== Marriage ==
Blanche married on 8 January 1345 her cousin Philip, Duke of Orléans (1336–1375), son of King Philip VI of France and Queen Joan the Lame. They had no children but Philip had illegitimate children. He died in 1376 and his title and lands returned to the royal domain.

Blanche died in 1393 and is buried in the chapel of Notre-Dame in the Basilica of St Denis.
