= Charles IV of France =

King of France and Navarre from 1322 to 1328

Charles IV
- Coronation of Charles the Fair, 14th century

King of France
- Reign: 3 January 1322 – 1 February 1328
- Coronation: 21 February 1322
- Predecessor: Philip V
- Successor: Philip VI

King of Navarre
- Reign: 3 January 1322 – 1 February 1328
- Predecessor: Philip II
- Successor: Joan II and Philip III
- Born: 18/19 June 1294; Clermont, Oise, France
- Died: 1 February 1328 (aged 33); Vincennes, France
- Burial: Saint Denis Basilica
- Spouses: Blanche of Burgundy (m. 1307; ann. 1322) Marie of Luxembourg (m. 1322; died 1324) Joan of Évreux (m. 1324)
- Issue more...: Marie of France; Blanche, Duchess of Orléans
- House: Capet
- Father: Philip IV of France
- Mother: Joan I of Navarre

Charles IV (Note: The first French king to assume a regnal number was Charles V, in 1364.) (18/19 June 1294 – 1 February 1328), called the Fair (le Bel) in France and the Bald (el Calvo) in Navarre, was the last king of the direct line of the House of Capet, King of France and King of Navarre (as Charles I) from 1322 to 1328. Charles was the third son of Philip IV; like his father, he was known as "the fair" or "the handsome".

Beginning in 1323 Charles was confronted with a peasant revolt in Flanders, and in 1324 he made an unsuccessful bid to be elected Holy Roman Emperor. As Duke of Guyenne, King Edward II of England was a vassal of Charles, but he was reluctant to pay homage to another king. In retaliation, Charles conquered the Duchy of Guyenne in a conflict known as the War of Saint-Sardos (1324). In a peace agreement, Edward II accepted to swear allegiance to Charles and to pay a fine. In exchange, Guyenne was returned to Edward but with a much-reduced territory.

When Charles IV died without a male heir, the senior line of the House of Capet, descended from Philip IV, became extinct. He was succeeded in Navarre by his niece Joan II and in France by his paternal first cousin Philip of Valois. However, the dispute on the succession to the French throne between the Valois monarchs descended in male line from Charles's grandfather Philip III of France, and the English monarchs descended from Charles's sister Isabella, was a factor of the Hundred Years' War.

== Personality and marriage ==
By virtue of the birthright of his mother, Joan I of Navarre, Charles claimed the title Charles I, King of Navarre. From 1314 to his accession to the throne, he held the title of Count of La Marche and was crowned King of France in 1322 at the cathedral in Reims. Unlike Philip IV and Philip V, Charles is reputed to have been a relatively conservative, "strait-laced" king – he was "inclined to forms and stiff-necked in defence of his prerogatives", while disinclined either to manipulate them to his own ends or achieve wider reform.

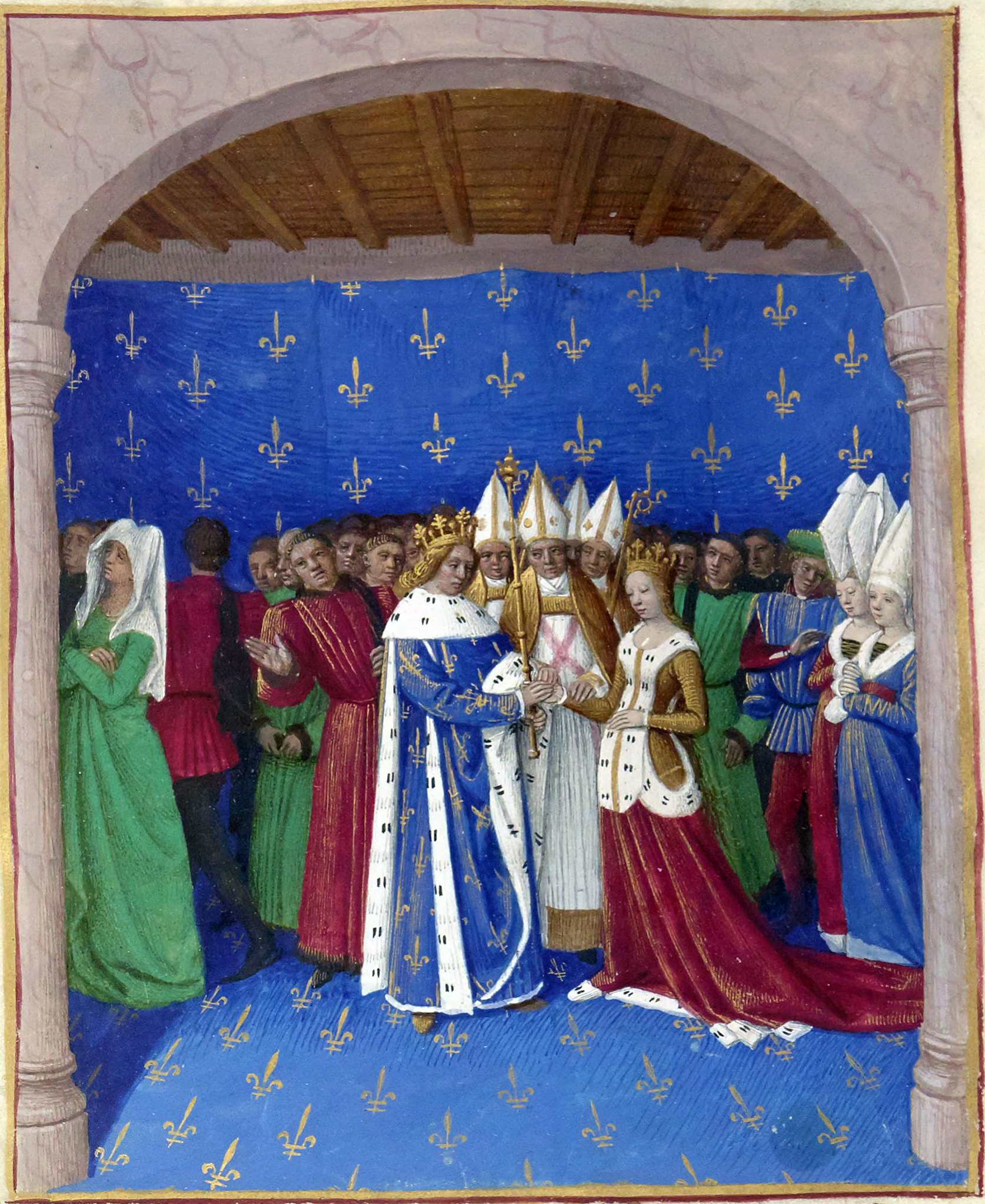
Marriage of Charles IV and Marie of Luxembourg, by Jean Fouquet.

Charles's coat-of-arms from when he was Count of La Marche.

Charles married his first wife, Blanche of Burgundy, the daughter of Otto IV, Count of Burgundy, in 1308, but Blanche was caught up in the Tour de Nesle scandals of 1314 and imprisoned. After Charles assumed the throne he refused to release Blanche, their marriage was annulled, and Blanche retreated to a nunnery. His second wife, Marie of Luxembourg, the daughter of Henry VII, the Holy Roman Emperor, died following a premature birth.

Charles married again in 1325, this time to Jeanne d'Évreux: she was his first cousin, and the marriage required approval from Pope John XXII. Jeanne was crowned queen in 1326, in one of the better recorded French coronation ceremonies. The ceremony represented a combination of a political statement, social event, and an "expensive fashion statement"; the cost of food, furs, velvets, and jewellery for the event was so expensive that negotiations over the cost were still ongoing in 1329. The coronation was also the first appearance of the latterly famous medieval cook, Guillaume Tirel, then only a junior servant.

During the first half of his reign Charles relied heavily on his uncle, Charles of Valois, for advice and to undertake key military tasks. Charles of Valois was a powerful magnate in his own right, a key advisor to Louis X, and he had made a bid for the regency in 1316, initially championing Louis X's daughter Joan, before finally switching sides and backing Philip V. Charles of Valois would have been aware that if Charles died without male heirs, he and his male heirs would have a good claim to the crown.

== Domestic policy ==
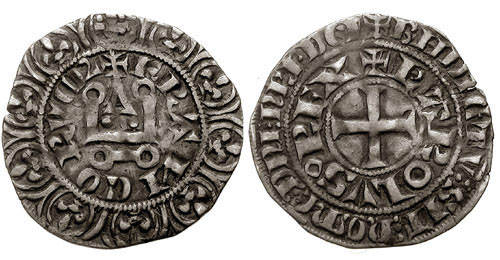
A Charles IV tournois coin; Charles debased the French coinage during his reign, creating some unpopularity.

Charles came to power following a troublesome two years in the south of France, where local nobles had resisted his elder brother Philip V's plans for fiscal reform, and where his brother had fallen fatally ill during his progress of the region. Charles undertook rapid steps to assert his own control, executing the Count of L'Isle-Jourdain, a troublesome southern noble, and making his own royal progress. Charles, a relatively well educated king, also founded a famous library at Fontainebleau.

During his six-year reign Charles's administration became increasingly unpopular. He debased the coinage to his own benefit, sold offices, increased taxation, exacted burdensome duties, and confiscated estates from enemies or those he disliked. He was also closely involved in Jewish issues during the period. Charles's father, Philip IV, had confiscated the estates of numerous Jews in 1306, and Charles took vigorous, but unpopular, steps to call in Christian debts to these accounts. Following the 1321 leper scare, in which numerous Jews had been fined for their alleged involvement in a conspiracy to poison wells across France through local lepers, Charles worked hard to execute these fines. Finally, Charles at least acquiesced, or at worst actively ordered, in the expulsion of many Jews from France following the leper scare.

== Foreign policy ==
=== Charles and England ===
Charles inherited a long-running period of tension between England and France. Edward II, King of England, as Duke of Aquitaine, owed homage to the King of France, but he had successfully avoided paying homage under Charles's older brother Louis X, and had only paid homage to Philip V under great pressure. Once Charles took up the throne, Edward attempted to avoid payment again. One of the elements in the disputes was the border province of Agenais, part of Gascony and in turn part of Aquitaine. Tensions rose in November 1323 after the construction of a bastide, a type of fortified town, in Saint-Sardos, part of the Agenais, by a French vassal. Gascon forces destroyed the bastide, and in turn Charles attacked the English-held Montpezat: the assault was unsuccessful, but in the subsequent War of Saint-Sardos Charles's trusted uncle and advisor, Charles of Valois, successfully wrested control of Aquitaine from the English; by 1324, Charles had declared Edward's lands forfeit and had occupied the whole of Aquitaine apart from the coastal areas.

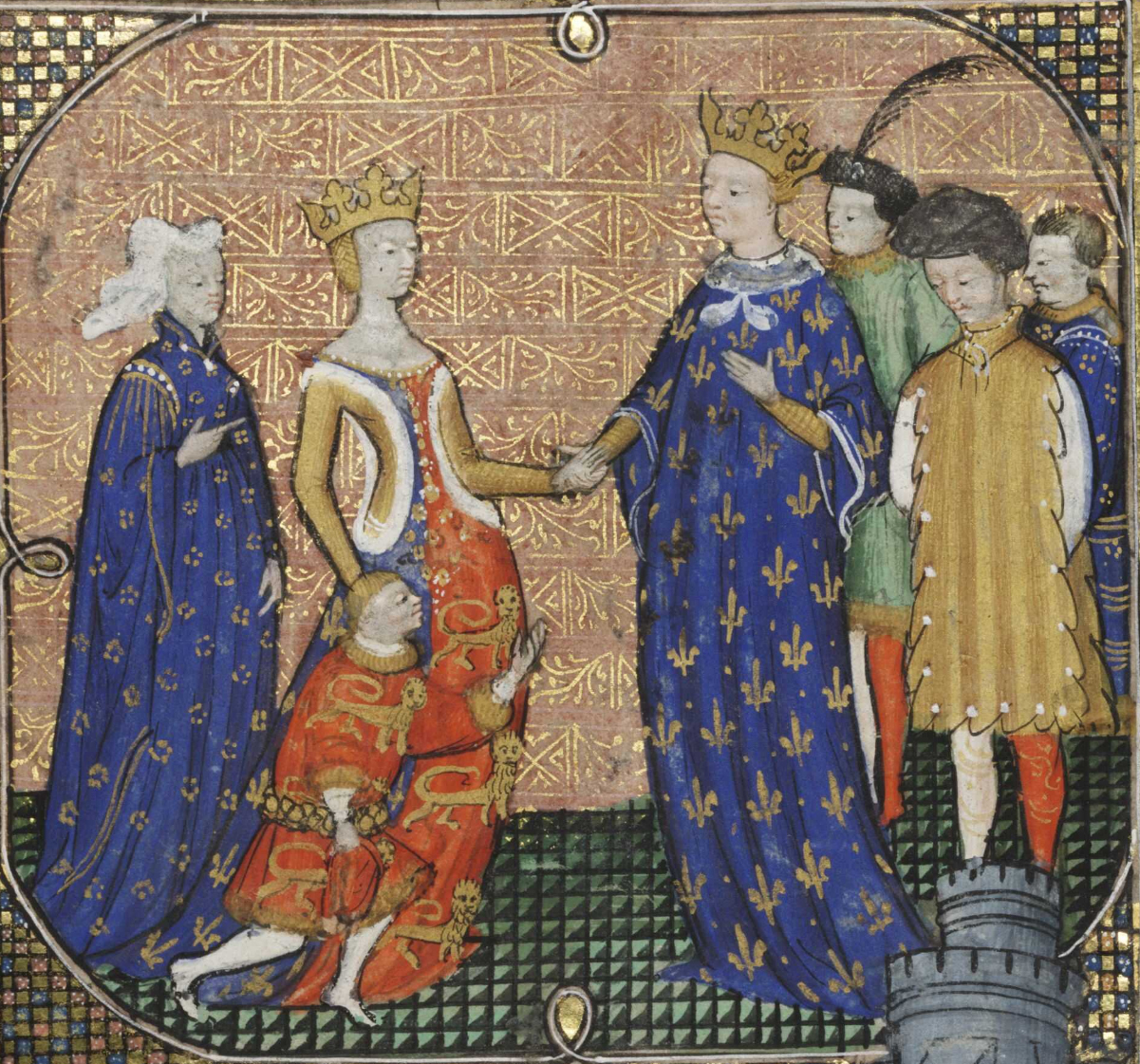
An early 15th-century miniature showing the future Edward III giving homage to Charles IV under the guidance of Edward's mother, and Charles's sister, Isabella, in 1325.

Charles's sister Isabella, wife of King Edward II, was sent to France in 1325 with the official mission of negotiating peace with her brother; unofficially, some chroniclers suggested that she was also evading Hugh Despenser the elder and Hugh the younger, her political enemies in England. Charles had sent a message through Pope John XXII to Edward suggesting that he was willing to reverse the forfeiture of the lands if Edward ceded the Agenais and paid homage for the rest of the lands. The Pope in turn had proposed Isabella as an ambassador. Charles met with Isabella and was said to have welcomed her to France. Isabella was joined by the young Prince Edward later that year, who paid homage to Charles on his father's behalf as a peace gesture. Despite this, Charles refused to return the lands in Aquitaine to the English king, resulting in a provisional agreement under which Edward resumed administration of the remaining English territories in early 1326, whilst France continued to occupy the rest.

In 1326 after negotiations with Thomas Randolph, 1st Earl of Moray, Charles renewed the Auld Alliance with Scotland through the Treaty of Corbeil (1326).

Meanwhile, Isabella had entered into a relationship with the exiled English nobleman Roger Mortimer and refused to return to England, instead travelling to Hainaut, where she betrothed Prince Edward to Philippa, the daughter of the local Count. She then used this money, plus an earlier loan from Charles, to raise a mercenary army and invade England, deposing her husband Edward II, who was then murdered in 1327. Under Isabella's instruction, Edward III agreed to a peace treaty with Charles: Aquitaine would be returned to Edward, with Charles receiving 50,000 livres, the territories of Limousin, Quercy, the Agenais, and Périgord, and the Bazas county, leaving the young Edward with a much reduced territory.

=== Revolt in Flanders ===
Charles faced fresh problems in Flanders. Louis, the Count of Flanders, ruled an "immensely wealthy state" that had traditionally led an autonomous existence on the edge of the French state. The French king was generally regarded as having suzerainty over Flanders, but under former monarchs the relationship had become strained. Philip V had avoided a military solution to the Flanders problem, instead enabling the succession of Louis as count – Louis was, to a great extent, already under French influence, having been brought up at the French court. Over time, however, Louis' clear French loyalties and lack of political links within Flanders itself began to erode his position within the county itself. In 1323 a peasant revolt led by Nicolaas Zannekin broke out, threatening the position of Louis and finally imprisoning him in Bruges.

Charles was relatively unconcerned at first, since in many ways the revolt could help the French crown by weakening the position of the Count of Flanders over the long term. By 1325, however, the situation was becoming worse and Charles's stance shifted. Not only did the uprising mean that Louis could not pay Charles some of the monies due to him under previous treaties, the scale of the rebellion represented a wider threat to the feudal order in France itself, and to some it might appear that Charles was actually unable, rather than unwilling, to intervene to protect his vassal. Accordingly, France intervened.

In November 1325 Charles declared the rebels guilty of high treason and ordered them excommunicated, mobilising an army at the same time. Louis pardoned the rebels and was then released, but once safely back in Paris he shifted his position and promised Charles not to agree to any separate peace treaty. Despite having amassed forces along the border, Charles's military attentions were distracted by the problems in Gascony, and he eventually chose to settle the rebellion peacefully through the Peace of Arques in 1326, in which Louis was only indirectly involved.

=== Charles and the Holy Roman Empire ===
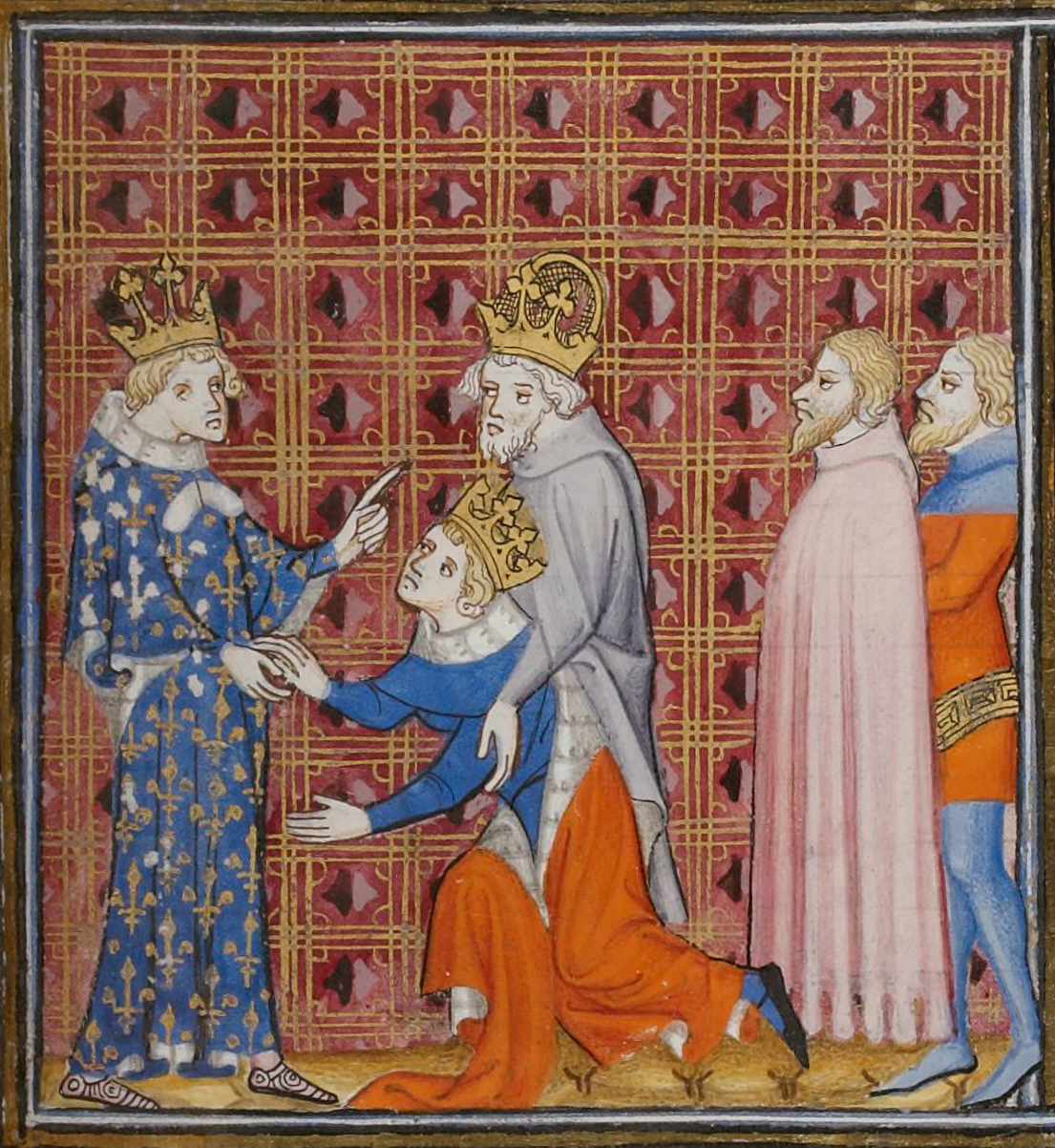
Charles gave his name to his nephew, Holy Roman Emperor Charles IV, shown here giving homage to his patron.

Charles was also responsible for shaping the life of his nephew, Holy Roman Emperor Charles IV. The latter, originally named Wenceslaus, came to the French court in 1323, aged seven, where he was taken under the patronage of the French king. Charles gave his nephew a particularly advanced education by the standards of the day, arranged for his marriage to Blanche of Valois, and also renamed him.

=== Charles and the Crusades ===
The crusades remained a popular cause in France during Charles's reign. His father, Philip IV, had committed France to a fresh crusade and his brother, Philip V, had brought plans for a fresh invasion close to execution in 1320. Their plans were cancelled, however, leading to the informal and chaotic Shepherds' Crusade.

Charles entrusted Charles of Valois to negotiate with Pope John XXII over a fresh crusade. Charles, a keen crusader who took the cross in 1323, had a history of diplomatic intrigue in the Levant – he had attempted to become the Byzantine emperor earlier in his career. The negotiations floundered, however, over the Pope's concerns whether Charles IV would actually use any monies raised for a crusade for actual crusading, or whether they would be frittered away on the more general activities of the French crown. Charles of Valois's negotiations were also overtaken by the conflict with England over Gascony.

After the death of Charles of Valois, Charles became increasingly interested in a French intervention in Byzantium, taking the cross in 1326. Andronicus II responded by sending an envoy to Paris in 1327, proposing peace and discussions on ecclesiastical union. A French envoy sent in return with Pope John's blessing later in the year, however, found Byzantium beset with civil war, and negotiations floundered. The death of Charles the next year prevented any French intervention in Byzantium.

== Death and legacy ==
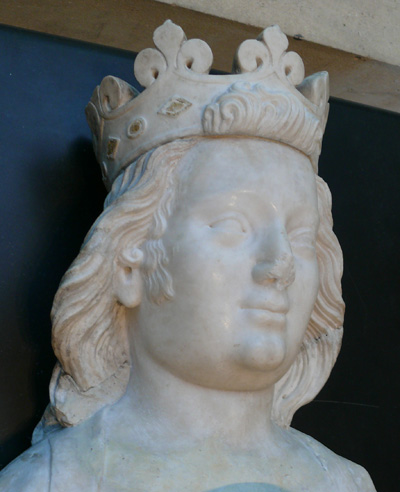
Tomb effigy of Charles IV

Charles IV died in 1328 at the Château de Vincennes, Val-de-Marne, and is interred with his third wife, Jeanne d'Évreux, in Saint Denis Basilica, with his heart buried at the now-demolished church of the Couvent des Jacobins in Paris.

Like his brothers before him, Charles died without a surviving male heir, thus ending the direct line of the Capetian dynasty. Twelve years earlier, a rule against succession by women, arguably derived from the Salic Law, had been recognised – with some dissent – as controlling succession to the French throne. The application of this rule barred Charles's one-year-old daughter Mary, by Jeanne d'Évreux, from succeeding as the monarch, but Jeanne was also pregnant at the time of Charles's death. Since she might have given birth to a son, a regency was set up under the heir presumptive Philip of Valois, son of Charles of Valois and a member of the House of Valois, the next most senior branch of the Capetian dynasty.

After two months, Jeanne gave birth to another daughter, Blanche, and thus Philip became king and in May was consecrated and crowned Philip VI. Edward III of England claimed, however, that although the Salic law should forbid inheritance by a woman, it did not forbid inheritance through the matrilineal line . Thus Edward III, son of Queen Isabella, wife of Edward II and daughter of Philip IV, has the right to the French throne by inheritance. Pressing the claim to the French throne eventually caused the Hundred Years War (1337–1453).

== Family and succession ==
Charles married three times and fathered seven legitimate children. In 1308, he married Blanche of Burgundy, daughter of Otto IV, Count of Burgundy. The marriage was dissolved in 1322. They are sometimes said to have had a son named Philip, but this is based on a misreading of sources. They had one daughter:

1. Joan (before 5 January 1314 – 18 May 1320).

In 1322, Charles married Marie of Luxembourg, daughter of Holy Roman Emperor Henry VII. They had:

1. Marie (born and died 1323).
2. Louis (born and died March 1324).

On 5 July 1324 at Anet, Charles married Joan of Évreux (1310–71), the daughter of Louis, Count of Évreux. They had:

1. Jeanne (1325 – January 1327)
2. Marie (October 1326 – 6 October 1341)
3. Blanche (1 April 1328 – 8 February 1393), married Philip, Duke of Orléans and Count of Valois, younger son of King Philip VI of France, they had no children.

All but one of Charles's children died young. Only his youngest daughter, Blanche, survived to adulthood. Incidentally, Blanche was born two months after Charles died. During those two months, Charles's cousin Philip served as regent pending the birth of the child. Once a female child was born, the regent succeeded to the throne as King Philip VI of France, becoming the first French king from the House of Valois.

== In fiction ==
Charles is a character in Les Rois maudits (The Accursed Kings), a series of French historical novels by Maurice Druon. He was portrayed by Gilles Béhat in the 1972 French miniseries adaptation of the series, and by Aymeric Demarigny in the 2005 adaptation.

== Bibliography ==
- Ainsworth, Peter. Representing Royalty: Kings, Queens and Captains in Some Early Fifteenth Century Manuscripts of Froissart's Chroniques. in Kooper (ed) 2006.
- Anselme de Sainte-Marie, Père (1726). Histoire généalogique et chronologique de la maison royale de France [Genealogical and chronological history of the royal house of France] (in French). Vol. 1 (3rd ed.). Paris: La compagnie des libraires.
- Echols, Anne and Marty Williams. (1992) An Annotated Index of Medieval Women. Princeton: Markus Wiener.
- Geanakoplos, Deno. (1975) Byzantium and the Crusades: 1261–1354. in Hazard (ed) 1975.
- Given-Wilson, Chris and Nigel Saul (eds). (2002) Fourteenth Century England, Volume 2. Woodridge: Boydell Press.
- Hassall, Arthur. (2009) France Mediaeval and Modern: a History. BiblioBazaar.
- Hazard, Harry H. (ed), (1975) A History of the Crusades: The Fourteenth and Fifteenth Centuries, Volume 3. Wisconsin: Wisconsin Press.
- Holmes, George. (2000) Europe, Hierarchy and Revolt, 1320–1450, 2nd edition. Oxford: Blackwell.
- Housley, Norman. (1986) The Avignon papacy and the Crusades, 1305–1378. Oxford: Clarendon Press.
- Kibler, William W. (1995) Medieval France: an Encyclopedia. London: Routledge.
- Kooper, Erik (ed). (2006) The Medieval Chronicle IV. Amsterdam: Rodopi.
- Lord, Carla. (2002) Queen Isabella at the Court of France. in Given-Wilson and Saul (eds) (2002).
- Neillands, Robin. (2001) The Hundred Years War. London: Routledge.
- Nirenberg, David. (1996) Communities of Violence: Persecution of Minorities in the Middle Ages. Princeton: Princeton University Press.
- Stasser, Thierry. "The Third Marriage of King Charles IV of France and his Offspring." Medieval Prosopography 14.2 (1993): 1–26.
- Sumption, Jonathan. (1999) The Hundred Years War: Trial by Battle. Philadelphia: Pennsylvania University Press.
- TeBrake, William Henry. (1994) A Plague of Insurrection: Popular Politics and Peasant Revolt in Flanders, 1323–1328. Philadelphia: University of Pennsylvania Press.
- Vauchez, André, Richard Barrie Dobson and Michael Lapidge. (2000) Encyclopedia of the Middle Ages, Volume 1. Cambridge: James Clark.
- Wagner, John. A. (2006) Encyclopedia of the Hundred Years War. Westport: Greenwood Press.

Charles IV of France House of Capet Born: c. 1294 Died: 1 February 1328
Regnal titles
| Preceded by Philip V & II | King of France; 1322 – 1328 | Vacant Title next held by Philip VI |
| Preceded by Philip V & II | King of Navarre; 1322 – 1328 | Succeeded by Joan II & Philip III |
French nobility
| Vacant Title last held by Guy of Lusignan | Count of La Marche; 1314 – 1322 | Vacant Title next held by John II |
