= Joan of Navarre (nun) =

Navarrese princess (c. 1326–1387)

Joan of Navarre (Basque: Joana, Spanish: Juana, French: Jeanne; c. 1326 – 3 July 1387) was a princess from the French House of Évreux, the eldest child of King Philip III and Queen Joan II of Navarre.

Joan was born while her parents were still only count and countess of Évreux in northern France. As their firstborn child, Joan became heir presumptive to the Kingdom of Navarre upon her parents' accession in 1328, which made her a desirable bride. In 1329 the royal couple began negotiations with King Alfonso IV of Aragon about Joan's marriage to Alfonso's eldest son, the future Peter IV. The choice illustrated her parents' decision to build closer relations with their Iberian neighbours, but may have also been intended to prevent Peter from marrying a princess of England, France's traditional enemy. The negotiations took years due to Joan's status as heir presumptive. By that time, however, she was displaced in the line of succession by two brothers, Louis and Charles, born in 1330 and 1332 respectively. The possibility that she might inherit the crown one day was nevertheless taken into account when the betrothal was finally agreed in April 1333.

Joan's intended marriage never took place. She might have had an illness or a defect that made her younger sister Maria a bride more appealing to Peter IV. In order to make this union possible, Joan had to renounce her succession rights in favour of Maria and move to the Franciscan Abbey of Longchamp. As compensation, she received an annual rent of 1000 livres tournois from her father's lordship of Mantes. Joan was veiled a Poor Clare on the day of "translation Saint Francis" in 1337, and Maria's marriage to Peter took place the following year. This unusual outcome confused later historians and chroniclers, leading often to confusing Joan with her youngest sister, born in c. 1343 and also named Joan. Her brother Charles II of Navarre assigned her an additional income of 100 livres tournois in 1349. Joan died in the nunnery on 3 July 1387.

== Bibliography ==
- Surget, Marie-Laure (2008). Mariage et pouvoir : réflexion sur le rôle de l'alliance dans les relations entre les Evreux-Navarre et les Valois au XIV siècle (1325–1376). Laboratoire d'éthnographie régionale.
- Woodacre, Elena (2011). The Queen and her consort: succession, politics and partnership in the Kingdom of Navarre, 1274–1512. Bath Spa University.
- Woodacre, Elena (2013). The Queens Regnant of Navarre: Succession, Politics, and Partnership, 1274–1512. Palgrave Macmillan. ISBN 978-1-137-33914-0.
