= Beatrice of Castile, Queen of Portugal =

Beatrice of Castile, Queen of Portugal may refer to:

- Beatrice of Castile (1242–1303)
- Beatrice of Castile (1293–1359)
