= Agnes of Navarre =

Countess of Foix from 1349 to 1397

Agnès of Navarre
- Spouse: Gaston III, Count of Foix
- Issue: Gaston
- House: House of Évreux
- Father: Philip of Évreux
- Mother: Joan II of Navarre

Agnes of Navarre (French: Agnès d'Évreux, Spanish: Inés de Navarra; 1337 – 4 February 1397) was the daughter of Philip III of Navarre and Joan II of Navarre, and became Countess of Foix on marriage to Gaston III, Count of Foix. She was rumoured to have had an affair with poet Guillaume de Machaut and so inspired his poem Le Voir Dit.

== Poetry ==
A collection of her poetry Poésies d'Agnès de Navarre-Champagne, dame de Foix edited by Prosper Tarbé was published in 1856.

== Marriage ==
In 1349, Agnès married Gaston Fébus, Count of Foix. This was a strategic marriage, as the counts of Foix were neighbours who had provided military support in a 1335 war between Navarre and Castile. Joan II of Navarre (mother of Agnès) and Aliénor, Countess Dowager of Foix (mother of Gaston) arranged the marriage. Agnès' dowry, issued in May 1349, was substantial, and included rents of territories to be given to the couple by Philip VI of France. The couple married on 4 August 1349, before the entire French court. In December, Agnès renounced her rights to the crown of Navarre in exchange for a promise of the payment of the balance of her dowry.

The couple had one son who died at birth in 1359, and another in 1362, who was named Gaston.

== Marital discord ==
It was rumoured that Agnès had a pre-marital affair with the poet Guillaume de Machaut, because Machaut's editor Gustave Tarbe identified her as the lover the poet described in his book Le Voir Dit (A True Story). Some historians have suggested that this contributed to "thirteen years of unhappy marriage".

The cause most often blamed for the breakdown of the marriage, however, was financial. The Black Death had killed Joan II of Navarre in October, before Agnès' entire dowry had been fully paid. In addition, Agnès' brother Charles II of Navarre agreed to post a substantial bail for a man that the Count of Foix had captured (Arnaud-Amanieu d'Albret), but the Count did not trust that he would be paid. This caused an argument between the couple, and the Count reportedly said that he would release his prisoner "not for the love of you, but for the love of my son."

Shortly after Christmas in 1362, with their child aged three months old, Count Gaston sent the Countess Agnès to her brother in order to retrieve the ransom, allowing her to take only her personal linen. Agnès made a statement on her arrival in Pamplona listing the possessions that she had lost, which included a crown, jewels, a hanging tapestry, and other items. Charles refused to pay, and Agnès remained in Pamplona, estranged from her husband.

According to historian Jean Froissart, King Charles took advantage of this estrangement, and when the young Gaston visited his mother Charles gave him a bag of poison under the pretence that it was a love potion to rekindle the marriage. On Gaston's return to Orthez, this powder was revealed by his half brother Yvain to their father, who flew into a rage. Though temporarily quelled, Count Gaston later stormed into the boy's cell and killed him with a knife wound to the neck.

== Later life ==
Agnès appears to have lived for some time in France with her sister Blanche of Navarre, Queen of France, and then to have returned to Pamplona in 1373.
