= Battle of Alvalade =

1323 prevented battle in Lisbon, Portugal

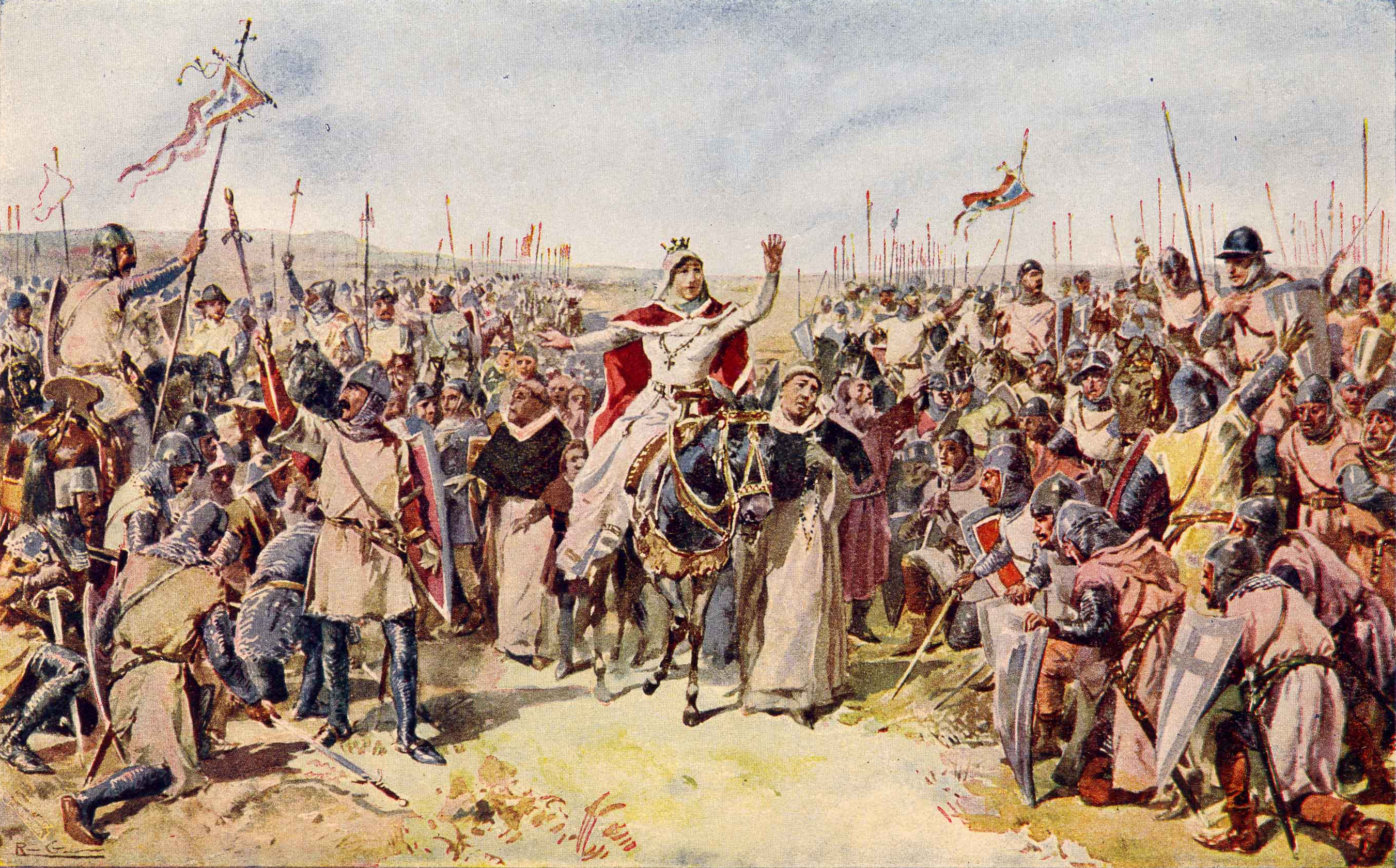
Queen Elizabeth of Portugal preventing the battle, by Alfredo Roque Gameiro

The Battle of Alvalade refers to a planned and prepared, but not realised, pitched battle in Alvalade, Portugal in 1323, between the troops of King Denis and the troops of his son Afonso. The fight was prevented at short notice by the intervention of Queen Elizabeth.
