= Philip III of Navarre =

King of Navarre from 1328 to 1343

Philip III
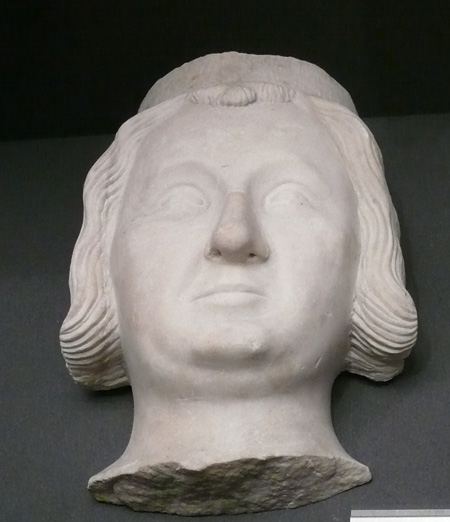
- Bust in the Louvre, originally from the Jacobin convent which housed Philip's heart

King of Navarre
- Reign: 1 April 1328 – 16 September 1343
- Coronation: 5 March 1329
- Predecessor: Charles I
- Successor: Joan II
- Co-monarch: Joan II
- Born: 27 March 1306
- Died: 16 September 1343 (aged 37)
- Burial: Pamplona Cathedral
- Spouse: Joan II of Navarre (m. 1318)
- Issue more...: Joan of Navarre; Maria, Queen of Aragon; Blanche, Queen of France; Charles II, King of Navarre; Philip, Count of Longueville; Agnes, Countess of Foix; Louis, Duke of Durazzo
- House: Évreux
- Father: Louis, Count of Évreux
- Mother: Margaret of Artois

Philip III (Basque: Filipe, Spanish: Felipe, French: Philippe; 27 March 1306 – 16 September 1343), called the Noble, the Wise, and of Évreux, was the king of Navarre with his wife Joan II from 1328 until his death in 1343. He was also the count of Évreux in France from 1319.

Philip was born a minor member of the French royal family, his father Louis of Évreux being a younger son of Philip III of France. In 1318, Philip married his cousin Joan, daughter of Louis X of France. He gained prominence when the Capetian main line went extinct, as he and Joan acquired the Kingdom of Navarre and a number of French fiefs. The couple's accession signified the end of the 44-year-long personal union between France and Navarre.

Although neither succeeded in claiming the crown of France, Philip and Joan were powerful vassals of the Valois king Philip VI of France as well as successful co-monarchs in Navarre. Despite initial reluctance by the Navarrese to accept him as king alongside Joan, Philip in particular is credited with improving the kingdom's legislature. The couple resided chiefly in their French lands but spent enough time in Navarre to earn them substantial popularity in the country. Philip actively supported his Valois cousin with his troops and as army leader, especially during the onset of the Hundred Years' War. During his joint reign with Joan, however, the focus of Navarre again shifted to its Iberian neighbours. This may have influenced Philip to join the crusade against the Kingdom of Granada, during which he fell ill, possibly wounded, and died.

== Capetian succession ==
Philip was the son of Louis, the count of Évreux, a younger son of King Philip III of France by his second wife, Marie of Brabant. Philip's father was the founder of the Capetian House of Évreux, while his mother, Margaret (d. 1311), belonged to another Capetian branch, the House of Artois. The House of Évreux was closely involved in negotiations about the succession of Philip's first cousin Louis X of France. At the time of his sudden death in 1316, Louis X's only child was a four-year-old daughter, Joan, which presented a problem because no Capetian king had ever died sonless. Joan's maternal family, the Capetian House of Burgundy, claimed the crown on her behalf, but her paternal uncle succeeded instead as King Philip V. Philip V also displaced her in succession to the Kingdom of Navarre, which had only recently come into Capetian hands through Queen Joan I, the mother of Philip V and Louis X.

Philip V was eventually pressured to renegotiate his niece's status. An agreement reached on 27 March 1318 included territorial concessions which placated Joan's maternal family, as well as her betrothal to Philip of Évreux, a dowry and a promise of succession to the counties of Champagne and Brie (also Joan I of Navarre's patrimony) if Philip V were to die sonless. Philip's marriage to Joan was celebrated on 18 June, after which she lived with his grandmother Queen Marie. A dispensation had been sought because Joan was only six years old. Philip inherited the fief of Évreux in Normandy upon his father's death in 1319. As Philip was a minor, his uncle Charles of Valois (d. 1325) was appointed his guardian. Although they lived near each other, Philip and Joan were not raised together due to age difference. Their union was not consummated until 1324.

Philip V died sonless in 1322 and all his patrimony passed to his and Louis X's younger brother, King Charles IV, who married Philip's sister Joan in 1325. When Charles too died leaving no sons on 1 February 1328, the direct male line of the House of Capet came to an end. With the bypassing first of Philip of Évreux's wife and then of Philip V's daughters, the principle of agnatic succession had become established. Philip of Évreux and his cousin Philip of Valois were the strongest Capetian candidates for the throne, while King Edward III of England claimed it as Charles IV's sororal nephew. The 15-year-old Edward's claim was dismissed, and the 35-year-old Philip of Valois was preferred over the 23-year-old Philip of Évreux on account of his more mature age. The House of Valois thus ascended the throne in the person of Philip VI, who immediately took Philip of Évreux on his council. The Valois had no right to the Kingdom of Navarre or the French counties of Champagne and Brie, however, as they were not descended from Joan I. Philip VI could not allow Philip of Évreux and his wife to take possession of Champagne and Brie since that, coupled with their holdings in Normandy, would give them a powerbase encircling his capital at Paris. Philip and Joan thus ceded these lands to Philip VI in return for the counties of Angoulême, Mortain and Longueville.

== Accession as king ==
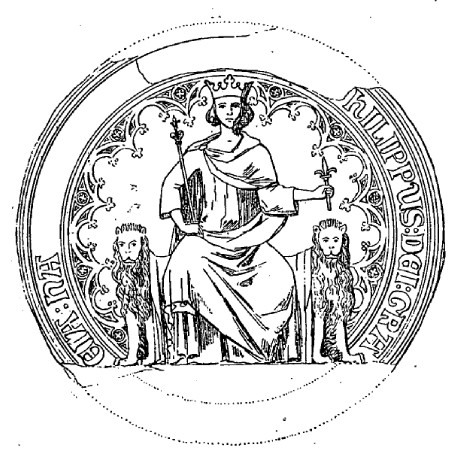
Seal of Philip III

The death of Joan's uncle Charles IV in February 1328 paved the way for Philip's accession to the throne of Navarre, as there was no longer anyone who could challenge the couple's right to it. The Navarrese, uncomfortable with repressive governors appointed from Paris, were pleased to see the personal union with France come to an end. They held a general assembly at Puente la Reina on 13 March, electing Juan Martínez de Medrano and Juan Corbarán de Lehet as regents. Philip's sister, the widowed Queen Joan, gave birth to Charles's daughter Blanche on 1 April. Her birth made it clear that the direct male line of the royal Capetian dynasty of France had become extinct with Charles IV's death. In May, the Navarrese assembly recognized Philip's wife as their sovereign. The ascension of the House of Évreux under Philip III is thus important as the beginning of a new era in the history of Navarre, now once again free from the government of France.

While Joan's hereditary right to the crown was universally recognized by the Estates, Philip's future role was not clear. Joan alone was invited to the capital Pamplona to assume government on her uncle's death. Philip was entirely ignored but determined to assert his own authority. The spouses negotiated with the Estates separately in July, and on 22 August Pope John XXII issued a bull confirming Philip as the king of Navarre. Of particular concern was Philip's role in the forthcoming coronation. The Estates insisted that Joan alone, as "the natural lady", would be raised on the shield and crowned and that "no one can be raised up if they are not the natural lord". They nevertheless agreed to allow Philip to take part in the government. Philip was dissatisfied, believing that his position would be undermined if he were not crowned alongside Joan. The couple's legates invoked the New Testament in support of Philip's rights as "husband and head", while also stressing that Joan as sovereign wished him to be crowned and to have more power as her co-ruler.

The Navarrese regency ended on 27 February 1329 in Larrasoaña, where Juan Martínez handed over the seals to Joan and Philip. In the end, both Joan and Philip were crowned, anointed by Bishop Arnalt de Barbazan and raised on the shield in Pamplona Cathedral on 5 March 1329. Philip and Joan were the first monarchs of Navarre to be crowned. The use of crowns and sceptres was an innovation in Navarrese royal ceremony, borrowed from Capetian tradition. Although they came to form part of the ceremonial of the subsequent Évreux monarchs, these elements had no significance to the Navarrese in 1329, to whom the oath was the essential act.

In May 1329, Philip and Joan signed a charter which emphasised repeatedly that she was the "true and natural heir" of Navarre, but that "all of the kingdom of Navarre would obey her consort under the name of king". Philip's role in securing his wife's smooth acquisition of the kingdom was also acknowledged. In order to limit Philip's involvement, however, it was stipulated that both he and Joan would renounce the crown as soon as their heir, male or female, reached the age of 21, or they were obliged to pay a fine of 100,000 livres tournois. Placing a limitation on the monarchs' reign was an unprecedented and extraordinary condition.

== Domestic policy ==
Philip and Joan's possessions, colored yellow, before the acquisition of Angoulême, Mortain and Longueville

Grandson of a king but raised with the expectation of being merely a count, Philip took kingship seriously. He was completely unprepared for the role but succeeded, all whilst counselling the newly enthroned king of France, in learning within a few months everything he needed to know about his new kingdom, and its people, language and institutions.

Philip III proved to be an effective and successful ruler. His most famous achievement was the improvement of the kingdom's law code in 1330. In September 1331 he and Joan moved back to France; they returned to Navarre in April 1336 and stayed in the kingdom until October 1337. Altogether, Philip and Joan stayed in the kingdom longer than any Navarrese monarch since 1274. They spent most of their time in their various French fiefs and in their Parisian palace, from where they were able to further their positions as French princes of the blood, but Philip ensured their visibility in Navarre during several visits. He even visited the kingdom on his own on several occasions, while Joan administered his own counties in France.

Philip and Joan's joint reign was marked by their close cooperation, but he prevailed in legislation and several other fields of government. Forty-one surviving royal decrees were issued in the names of both Philip and Joan, but Philip signed thirty-eight without referring to his wife, while only six were issued in Joan's name alone. The couple ensured that the Navarrese customs and laws were respected and that the kingdom's citizens were more directly involved in governance. Their active involvement in the administration of Navarre despite their absences, as well as putting the interests of Navarre ahead of those of their French homeland, earned them praise by both their contemporaries and by historians.

Economic development projects undertaken by Philip and Joan include the construction of an irrigation system in the arid fields of Tudela in the south of their kingdom, reparation of castles and erection of a new one in Castelrenault. The king and queen were also determined to ensure the enforcement of law in their realm, condemning the perpetrators of anti-Jewish riots that took place before their arrival and assigning compensation to the victims. A particular problem for them was banditry, which they strove to address at the onset of their reign. Their dedication to serving justice led the chroniclers to depict them as "a good king and queen and well-loved by all in their kingdom".

In 1338, Philip confiscated the lands of Mixe and Ostabarret to the crown. These lands had long belonged to the viscounts of Tartas in Guyenne, who did homage for them to the king of Navarre. In 1338, the old viscount, Guitard d'Albret, died, leaving Bernard Ezi IV, lord of Albret, his successor. He refused to do homage to Philip, who sent Juan de Rosas, castellan of Saint-Jean-Pied-de-Port to occupy Garris, the chief town of Mixe, and administer the territory as the king's bailiff. The nobility of the region apparently resented the royal action, and in September a small army of 200 troops under Guillem Arnalt de Irumberri was sent to restore order. Philip attached the lands and their revenues to the royal domain.

== Foreign relations ==
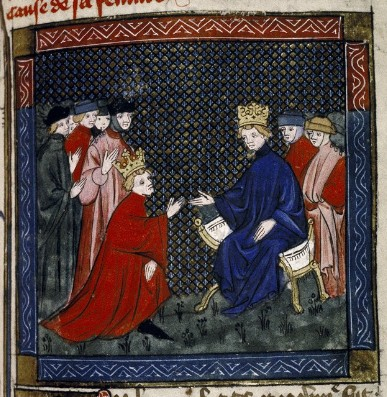
Philip III of Navarre doing hommage to Philip VI of France for his French lands

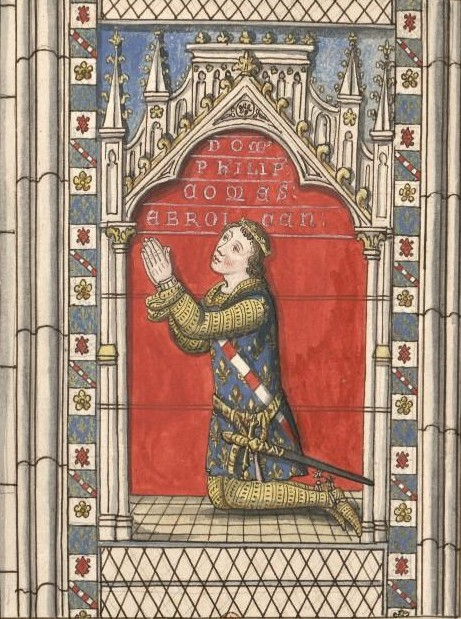
Sketch of a stained glass window depicting Philip III in the chapel of Saint Anne of Évreux Cathedral

In August 1328, Philip, only recently recognised as the king of Navarre, joined the king of France in the suppression of a peasant revolt in Flanders. At the battle of Cassel on 23 August, the international force assisting Philip VI, was divided into ten batailles, with the French king himself commanding the fifth. He was joined by thirty-nine banners in his bataille, among them that of Philip III.

Thereafter, Navarre's foreign policy during the reign of Philip III and Joan II shifted again towards Iberia. Though they remained entangled in French politics, the couple were keen to build closer relations with the neighbouring kingdoms of Aragon and Castile. From 1329 to 1333 they negotiated a marital alliance with Aragon; their eldest child and heir presumptive, a daughter named Joan, was to marry King Peter IV of Aragon. During the negotiations, however, two sons, Louis and Charles, were born to the couple and displaced the prospective bride in the succession. She eventually became a nun. The alliance with Aragon was nevertheless concluded in 1338 when Peter married Philip and Joan's second daughter, Marie.

From 1328 until 1331 Philip III of Navarre and Philip VI of France corresponded with Alfonso XI of Castile about a crusade against the Kingdom of Granada, but the action was postponed due to the French king's reluctance. On 1 October 1333, Pierre-Roger, then archbishop of Rouen, preached a crusading sermon before an assembly of noblemen in the presence of Philip VI in Paris. After the sermon, the king of France took the cross and, along with the king of Navarre and Dukes John III of Brabant, Odo IV of Burgundy and Louis I of Bourbon, vowed to go on a "holy voyage overseas" to restore the Kingdom of Jerusalem. This crusade was finally to be directed against Granada, but owing to instability in Europe was delayed indefinitely with papal approval on 13 March 1336.

In late June 1335, while Philip was in France, Navarre suffered the first of a series of violations of its border by Castile that escalated into war by October. Although neither Philip nor Alfonso had provoked hostilities, the latter felt bound to lead his army against Navarre. Philip sent the archbishop of Reims, Jean de Vienne, to negotiate a peace, which Alfonso was quick to agree. On 28 February 1336 at Las Cuevas, a peace treaty was signed. Count Gaston II of Foix had provided military assistance to Navarre, and after the war, Philip ordered his treasury to compensate the count.

The succession to the French throne proved to be far from settled by Philip of Valois's accession. In 1337 Edward III of England decided to claim France as the closest male relative of Charles IV. In December 1339, during the opening stages of the Hundred Years' War, Philip III of Navarre reinforced the garrison of Tournai in anticipation of an English siege. He was at the side of Philip VI of France and the kings allied with him, John of Bohemia and David II of Scotland, for the war's first campaign, when the French king lifted the sieges of Cambrai (1339) and Tournai (1340).

== Crusade and death ==
Philip returned to Navarre in 1342 and again in 1343, partly in preparation for joining the crusade against the Muslim state of Granada. He likely felt this was his duty as ruler of an Iberian kingdom. Philip's authorities ensured that his own Muslim subjects in Tudela were not disturbed by his crusading army. Philip arrived at the siege of Algeciras in July 1343 with 100 knights and 300 infantrymen, but more important than this small military force was the large quantity of provisions—meat, barley, bacon and wine—which he had sent from the Bay of Biscay. When Gaston II of Foix, an ally of Navarre in the war of 1335, abandoned the siege in late August, he tried unsuccessfully to convince Philip to leave as well.

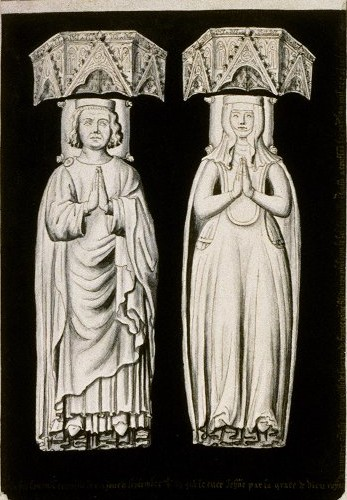
Tombs of Philip III and Joan II

In early September Philip fell ill, after being wounded by an arrow according to some reports. Alfonso XI offered him his own doctors, who advised Philip to change his diet. The king of Navarre, however, preferred the advice of his own doctor, who told him to keep eating meat and wine and to withdraw from the siege. He obediently withdrew, but got no further than Jerez de la Frontera, where he died on 16 September 1343. His body was brought back to Pamplona for burial, though his heart was buried at the now-demolished church of the Couvent des Jacobins in Paris. His widow, Joan, received a letter of condolences from Pope Clement VI (the former Pierre-Roger) in November. Algeciras fell in March 1344. Joan continued to reign alone until her death in 1349, when the crown passed to their eldest surviving son, Charles II.

== Family ==
Unlike the well-documented marriages of their Capetian predecessors, no evidence attests to Philip and Joan's personal relationship. This indicates that their marriage was marked neither by particular closeness nor difficulty. They were very rarely apart, however, and had nine children together.

- Joan (c. 1326–1387), nun at Longchamps
- Maria (c. 1329 – 1347), first wife of King Peter IV of Aragon
- Louis (1330–1334)
- Blanche (1331–1398), second wife of Philip VI of France
- Charles II the Bad (1332–1387), successor, count of Évreux and king of Navarre
- Philip, count of Longueville (c. 1333–1363), married Yolande de Dampierre
- Agnes (1334–1396), married Count Gaston III of Foix
- Louis (1341–1376), count of Beaumont-le-Roger, married firstly Maria de Lizarazu and secondly Duchess Joanna of Durazzo
- Joan (aft 1342–1403), married Viscount John I of the House of Rohan

=== Family tree ===
Henry I of Navarre	Isabella of Aragon	Philip III of France	Marie of Brabant
Joan I of Navarre	Philip IV of France	Charles of Valois	Louis of Évreux
Isabella of France	Louis X of France	Philip V of France	Charles IV of France	Philip VI of France
Edward III of England	Joan II of Navarre	Philip III of Navarre

== Bibliography ==
- Arias Guillén, Fernando (2012). "El linaje maldito de Alfonso X: conflictos en torno a la legitimidad regia en Castilla (c. 1275–1390)". Vínculos de Historia. 1: 147–63.
- Azcárate Aguilar-Amat, Pilar (1989). "La guerra de 1335 entre Castilla y Navarra". Hispania. 49 (173): 805–40.
- Azcárate Aguilar-Amat, Pilar (1995). "Aportación y muerte de Felipe de Evreux en la cruzada de Algeciras (1343)". In Eduardo Ripoll Perelló; Manuel Fernando Ladero Quesada (eds.). Actas del II Congreso Internacional "El Estrecho de Gibraltar", Ceuta, 1990. Vol. 3. Madrid. pp. 61–76.
- Burne, Alfred (1955). The Crecy War: A Military History of the Hundred Years War from 1337 to the Peace of Bretigny, 1360. London: Eyre & Spottiswoode.
- Goñi Gaztambide, José (1959). "La matanza de judíos en Navarra, en 1328". Hispania Sacra. 12 (23): 5–33.
- Guyot-Bachy, Isabelle (2002). "La diffusion du Roman des roys avant la Guerre de cent ans: le manuscrit de Pierre Honoré, serviteur de Charles de Valois". In Erik Kooper (ed.). The Medieval Chronicle II. Rodopi. pp. 90–102. ISBN 9042008342.
- Housley, Norman (1986). The Avignon Papacy and the Crusades, 1305–1378. Oxford University Press.
- Jones, Michael (1995). "The Last Capetians and Early Valois Kings, 1314–1364". In Michael Jones (ed.). The New Cambridge Medieval History, c.1300–c.1415. Vol. 6. Cambridge: Cambridge University Press. pp. 388–421.
- Knecht, Robert (2007). The Valois: Kings of France, 1328-1589. Bloomsbury Academic. ISBN 978-1-85285-522-2.
- Linehan, Peter (1995). "Castile, Navarre and Portugal". In Michael Jones (ed.). The New Cambridge Medieval History, c.1300–c.1415. Vol. 6. Cambridge: Cambridge University Press. pp. 619–50.
- Mahn-Lot, Marianne (1944). "Philippe d'Évreux, roi de Navarre, et un projet de croisade contre le royaume de Grenade (1329–1331)". Bulletin Hispanique. 46 (2): 227–33. doi:10.3406/hispa.1944.2977.
- Miranda García, Fermín (2003). Felipe III y Juana II de Evreux (in Spanish). Pamplona: Editorial Mintzoa. ISBN 9788485891931.
- Miranda García, Fermín (2016). "Felipe III de Navarra y el viaje de Granada". In Carlos de Ayala Martínez; J. Santiago Palacios Ontalva; Martín Ríos Saloma (eds.). Guerra santa y cruzada en el estrecho: El occidente peninsular en la primera mitad del siglo XIV. Madrid: Sílex.
- Monter, William (2012). The Rise of Female Kings in Europe, 1300–1800. Yale University Press.
- Mugueta Moreno, Íñigo; Tamburri Bariain, Pascual (2007). "Coronación juramentada: Navarra, 1329". Príncipe de Viana. 68 (240): 169–90.
- Morvan, Frederic (2009). La Chevalerie bretonne et la formation de l'armee ducale, 1260-1341 (in French). Presses Universitaires de Rennes. ISBN 978-2-7535-0827-9.
- Mugueta Moreno, Íñigo (2007). "La nobleza en Navarra (siglos XIII–XIV): una identidad militar". Iura Vasconiae. 4: 189–238.
- O'Callaghan, Joseph F. (2011). The Gibraltar Crusade: Castile and the Battle for the Strait. Philadelphia: University of Pennsylvania Press.
- Rigaudière, Albert (1995). "The Theory and Practice of Government in Western Europe in the Fourteenth Century". In Michael Jones (ed.). The New Cambridge Medieval History, c.1300–c.1415. Vol. 6. Cambridge: Cambridge University Press. pp. 17–41.
- Rogers, Clifford J. (1999). The Wars of Edward III: Sources and Interpretations. Boydell and Brewer. ISBN 0851156460.
- Segura Urra, Félix (2018). "Martínez de Medrano, Juan". Diccionario biográfico español. Real Academia de la Historia.
- Setton, Kenneth M. (1976). The Papacy and the Levant, 1204–1571: The Thirteenth and Fourteenth Centuries. Vol. 1. Philadelphia: American Philosophical Society.
- Sumption, Jonathan (1999). The Hundred Years War: Trial by Battle. Vol. 1. University of Pennsylvania Press. ISBN 0851156460.
- TeBrake, William H. (1993). A Plague of Insurrection: Popular Politics and Peasant Revolt in Flanders, 1323–1328. Philadelphia: University of Pennsylvania Press.
- Orella Unzué, José Luis (1985). "La Hermandad de Frontera entre Navarra y Guipúzcoa, s. XIV y XV" (PDF). Príncipe de Viana. 46 (175): 463–492.
- Woodacre, Elena (2013). The Queens Regnant of Navarre: Succession, Politics, and Partnership, 1274-1512. Palgrave Macmillan. ISBN 978-1-137-33914-0.
- Woodacre, Elena (2011). The Queen and her consort: succession, politics and partnership in the Kingdom of Navarre, 1274-1512 (Thesis). Bath Spa University.
- Viard, Jules (1922). "La guerre de Flandre (1328)". Bibliothèque de l'École des chartes. 83: 362–82. doi:10.3406/bec.1922.448676.

Philip III of Navarre House of Évreux Cadet branch of the Capetian dynasty Born: 27 March 1306 Died: 16 September 1343
Regnal titles
Preceded by Louis	Count of Évreux; 1319–1343	Succeeded by Charles
Preceded by Charles I	King of Navarre; 1328–1343 with Joan II	Succeeded by Joan II as sole ruler
