= Beatrice of Castile (1293–1359) =

Queen of Portugal from 1325 to 1357

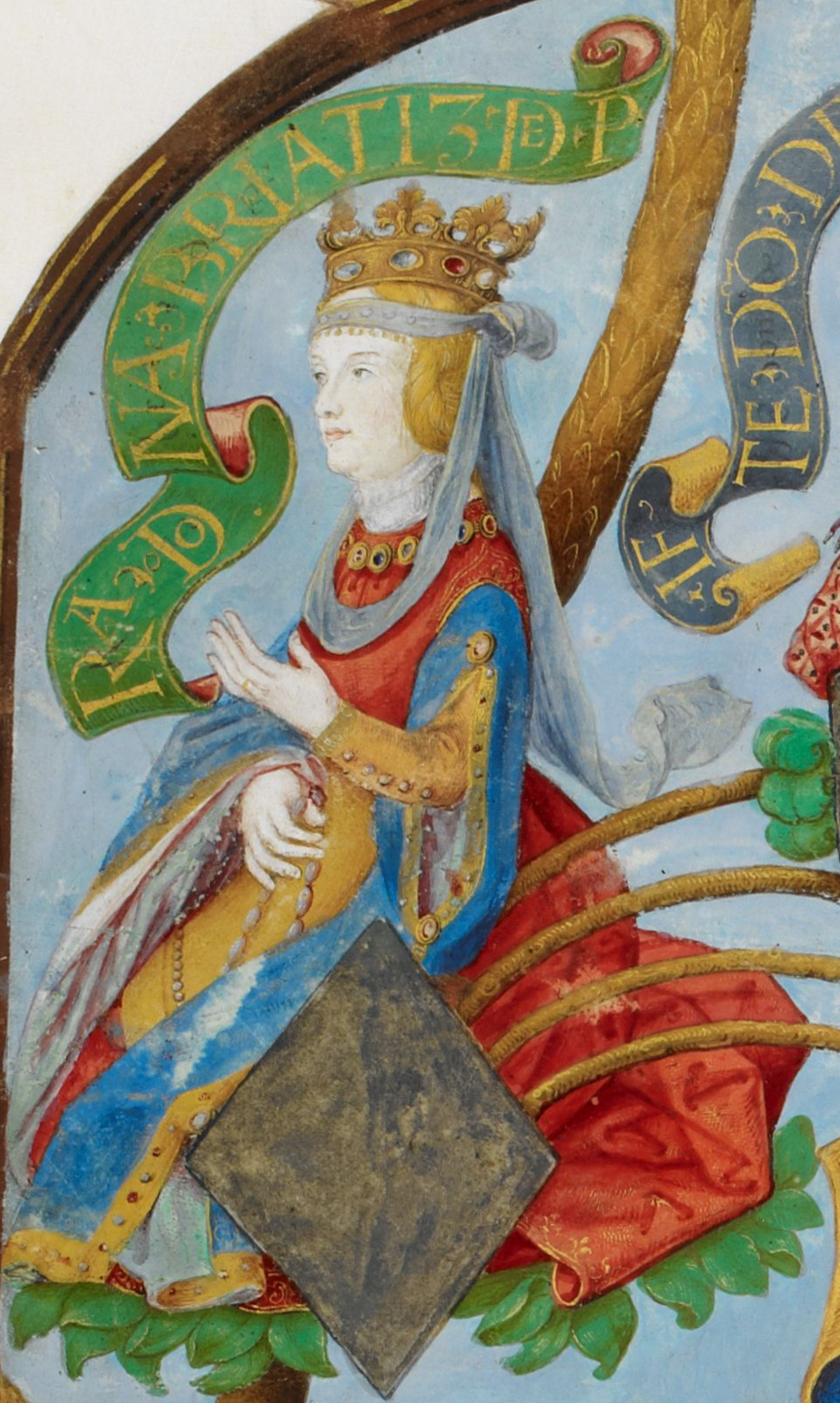
- Depiction in the Genealogy of the Royal Houses of Spain and Portugal (c. 1530–34)

Queen consort of Portugal
- Tenure: 7 January 1325 – 28 May 1357
- Born: 8 March 1293; Toro, Crown of Castile
- Died: 25 October 1359 (aged 66); Lisbon, Kingdom of Portugal
- Burial: Lisbon Cathedral
- Spouse: Afonso IV, King of Portugal (m. 1309; died 1357)
- Issue Among others...: Maria, Queen of Castile; Peter I of Portugal; Eleanor, Queen of Aragon
- House: Castilian House of Ivrea
- Father: Sancho IV, King of Castile
- Mother: María de Molina

Beatrice of Castile or Beatriz (1293 – 25 October 1359) was an infanta of Castile, daughter of Sancho IV and María de Molina. She was Queen of Portugal from the accession of her husband, Afonso IV, in 1325 until his death on 28 May 1357.

== Biography ==
=== Family origins and early years ===
Daughter of Sancho IV and of María de Molina, Infanta Beatrice was born in Toro. She had six siblings, including King Ferdinand IV of Castile and Queen Isabella, wife of King James II of Aragon, and later duchess as the wife of John III, Duke of Brittany.

On 13 September 1297, when Beatrice was only four years old, the bilateral agreement, known as the Treaty of Alcañices, was signed between Castile and Portugal, putting an end to the hostilities between both kingdoms and establishing the definitive borders. The treaty was signed by Queen María de Molina, as the regent of Castile on behalf of her son, Ferdinand IV, who was still a minor, and King Denis of Portugal. To reinforce the peace, the agreement included clauses arranging the marriages of King Ferdinand and Constance of Portugal and that of her brother, Afonso, with Beatrice; that is, the marriage of two siblings, infantes of Portugal, with two other siblings, infantes of Castile. (Note: The marriage of Ferdinand and Constance had been negotiated in a previous agreement signed on 15 September 1291. King Sancho IV of Castile later negotiated the marriage of his son Ferdinand with Blanche, daughter of King Philip IV of France. The betrothal of Ferdinand and Constance was ratified as part of the Treaty of Alcañices in 1297.)

Beatrice abandoned Castile in the same year and moved to the neighboring kingdom where she was raised in the court of King Denis together with her future spouse, Infante Afonso, who at that time was about six years old. Her future father-in-law "had inherited from his grandfather, Alfonso X of Castile, a love of letters, literature, Portuguese poetry, and the art of the troubadours" and Beatrice grew up in this refined environment. Two of the Portuguese king's illegitimate sons, both important figures in the kingdom's cultural panorama, were also at the court: Pedro Afonso, Count of Barcelos, a poet and troubadour and the author of Crónica Geral de Espanha and the Livro de Linhagens; and, Afonso Sanches, the favorite son of King Denis and a celebrated troubadour.

=== Arras and properties ===
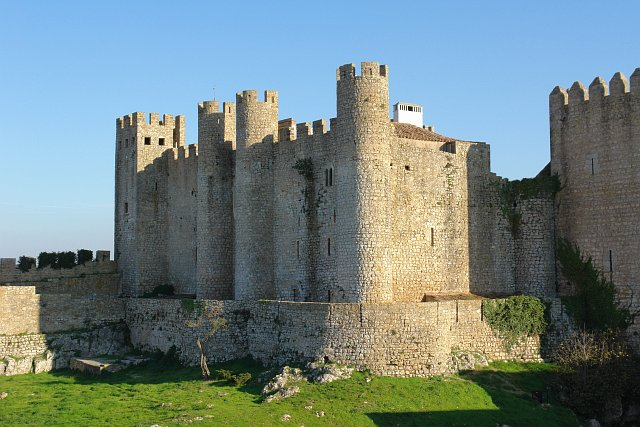
Óbidos castle, given to Beatrice by her son Peter I of Portugal

After the signing of the Treaty of Alcañices and upon their return to Portugal, King Denis gave his future daughter-in-law the Carta de Arras (wedding tokens) which included the señoríos of Évora, Vila Viçosa, Vila Real and Vila Nova de Gaia which generated an annual income of more than 6000 pounds of the old Portuguese currency. After the marriage, these estates were increased. In 1321, her husband, who had not ascended to the throne yet, gave her Viana do Alentejo; in 1325, he gave her other properties in Santarém; in 1337, properties in Atalaia; in 1341, a manor house in Alenquer; in 1350, the prior of the Monastery of San Vicente de Fora gave her Melide, a manor house in Sintra; and later, in 1357, her son, King Peter, gave her more estates which included Óbidos, Atouguia, Torres Novas, Ourém, Porto de Mós, and Chilheiros.

=== Marriage ===
The marriage was celebrated in Lisbon on 12 September 1309. Before the marriage could take place, a papal dispensation was required since Afonso was a great-grandson of King Alfonso X of Castile through his illegitimate daughter, Beatrice of Castile, and Beatrice, betrothed to Afonso, was a granddaughter of the same Castilian king. In 1301, Pope Boniface VIII issued the papal bull authorizing the marriage, but since both were underage, it was postponed until 1309 when Afonso was eighteen years old and Beatrice had turned sixteen. It was a fertile and apparently happy marriage. Afonso broke the tradition of previous kings and did not have any children out of wedlock. (Note: "We assume that after the marriage of dona Beatriz and don Alfonso IV, married life was harmonious (...) based on the fact that D. Afonso IV did not have any bastard children, thereby breaking a long family tradition" (loose translation)) (Note: "Perhaps since he had so many problems with those of his father, D. Afonso did not have any illegitimate children." (loose translation)) (Note: "There are no known bastard children of the king. Two possible explanations could be the ties of profound esteem, friendship and respect that existed because he had been raised and had lived from a very early age with his future wife or, perhaps, because he wanted to avoid that his heirs had the same problems that he had had with his bastard brothers".(loose translation)) Four out of the seven children born of this marriage died in their infancy.

=== A reconciling queen ===
Like her mother-in-law, Elizabeth of Aragon, who had raised her as a child, during her marriage Beatrice played a relevant role in the affairs of the kingdom and was "the first foreign-born queen who was perfectly versed in the language and customs of Portugal which facilitated her role as a mediator of conflicts". She discreetly supported her husband when he confronted his father on account of his half-brother, Afonso Sanches. In 1325 after the death of King Denis, Afonso "who had not forgotten former hatreds", demanded to be acclaimed king by the court and was responsible for having his half brother João Afonso killed, and his great rival, his other bastard brother, Afonso Sanches, banished to Castile".

When her husband and her son-in-law King Alfonso XI of Castile fought in the war that took place in 1336 – 1339, Beatrice crossed the border and went to Badajoz to meet the Castilian king to try to reach an agreement that would bring peace to both kingdoms, although her efforts proved to be fruitless. She sent her ambassadors in 1338 to the court of King Alfonso IV of Aragon to strengthen the alliance between both kingdoms which had been weakened when her son, the future King Peter I of Portugal, refused to marry Blanche, a niece of the Aragonese king because of her proven "mental weakness (...) and her incapacity for marriage".

Queen Beatrice and Guilherme de la Garde, Archbishop of Braga, acted as mediators in the quarrel, which lasted almost one year and posed the threat of another civil war in the Kingdom of Portugal following the assassination of Inés de Castro, and in 1355, father and son reached an agreement.

On the religious front, she founded a hospital in 1329 in Lisbon and later, with her husband, the Hospital da Sé to treat twenty-four poor people of both sexes, providing the institution with all that was required for its day-to-day maintenance. In her last wills and codicil, she left many properties and sums for religious establishments, particularly for the Dominican and Franciscan orders, and asked to be buried wearing the simple robe of the latter order.

=== Issue ===
Beatrice and Alfonso IV were the parents of the following infantes:

- Maria (1313 – 18 January 1357), was the wife of Alfonso XI of Castile, and mother of the future king Peter I of Castile. Due to the affair of her husband with his mistress Leonor de Guzmán "it was an unfortunate union from the start, contributing to dampening the relations of both kingdoms";
- Afonso (Penela, 1315 – 1317), heir to the throne, died in his infancy. Buried at the disappeared Convento das Donas of the Dominican Order in Santarém;
- Denis (born 12 February 1317 in Santarém), heir to the throne, died a few months after his birth, (Note: He died sometime before 13 June 1317 as evidenced by a letter from Pope John XII to King Denis expressing his condolences for the death of his grandson.) and was buried in Alcobaça Monastery;
- Peter (8 April 1320 – 18 January 1367), the first surviving male offspring, he succeeded his father. When his wife Constance died in 1345, Queen Beatrice took care of the education of the two orphans, the infantes Maria and Ferdinand, who later reigned as King Ferdinand I of Portugal;
- Isabel (21 December 1324 – 11 July 1326), buried at the Monastery of Santa Clara-a-Velha in Coimbra;
- John (23 September 1326 – 21 June 1327), buried at the Monastery of São Dinis de Odivelas;
- Eleanor (1328 – 1348), born in the same year as her sister Maria's wedding, she married King Peter IV of Aragon in November 1347 in Barcelona and died a year after her marriage succumbing to the Black Death.

=== Death and burial ===
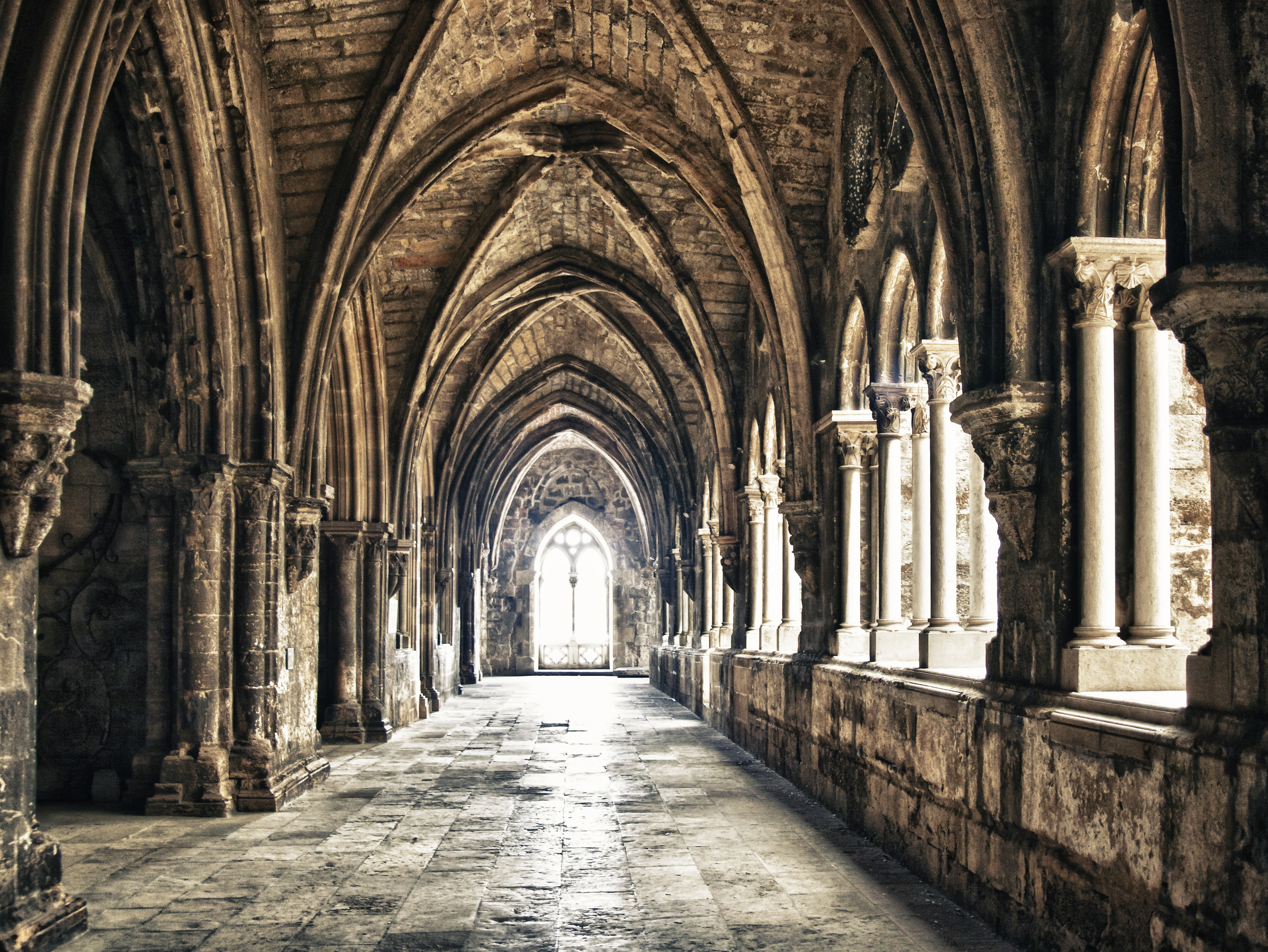
Cloisters of Lisbon Cathedral where King Afonso IV and Beatrice of Castile were buried

Queen Beatrice executed three wills and one codicil. She died in Lisbon when she was 66 years old and was buried at Lisbon Cathedral next to her husband as she had stipulated in her will. While the definitive tombs were being built, the royal couple was originally buried at the choir of the church and it was not until the reign of King John I that their remains were transferred to the new sepulchers in the main chapel of the cathedral. These sepulchers were destroyed during the 1755 Lisbon earthquake and were replaced in the 18th century. The Livros do Cartóiro da Sé (Charters of the cathedral) written between 1710 and 1716, describe the burial of Queen Beatrice, very similar to that of her husband, with an engraving that read: Beatriz Portugaliae Regina / Affonsi Quarti Uxor.(Beatrice Queen of Portugal, wife of Afonso IV).

== Bibliography ==
- González Mínguez, César (2004). "Fernando IV de Castilla (1295-1312): Perfil de un reinado" (PDF). Espacio, Tiempo y Forma, Serie III, Historia Medieval (in Spanish). No. 17. Madrid: Universidad Nacional de Educación a Distancia (UNED), Facultad de Geografía e Historia. pp. 223–244. ISSN 0214-9745.
- Lourenço Menino, Vanda Lisa (2008). "Cartas de Arras da Rainha D. Beatriz (1309-1359)" (PDF). Estudios humanísticos. Historia (in Portuguese). No. 7. León: Universidad de León: Servicio de Publicaciones. pp. 349–358. ISSN 1696-0300. Archived from the original (PDF) on 18 April 2014.
- Rodrigues Oliveira, Ana (2010). Rainhas medievais de Portugal. Dezassete mulheres, duas dinastias, quatro séculos de História (in Portuguese). Lisbon: A esfera dos livros. ISBN 978-989-626-261-7.
- Sotto Mayor Pizarro, José Augusto (1997). Linhagens Medievais Portuguesas: Genealogias e Estratégias (1279-1325 (in Portuguese). Oporto: Doctorate thesis, author's edition. hdl:10216/18023.
- Sousa, António Caetano de (1735). Historia Genealógica da Casa Real Portugueza (PDF) (in Portuguese). Lisbon: Lisboa Occidental, of. de Joseph Antonio Da Sylva, Impressor da Academia Real. OCLC 3910285.

Portuguese royalty
Preceded by Elizabeth of Aragon	Queen consort of Portugal; 7 January 1325 – 28 May 1357	Succeeded by Leonor Teles
