= Afonso IV of Portugal =

King of Portugal from 1325 to 1357

Afonso IV
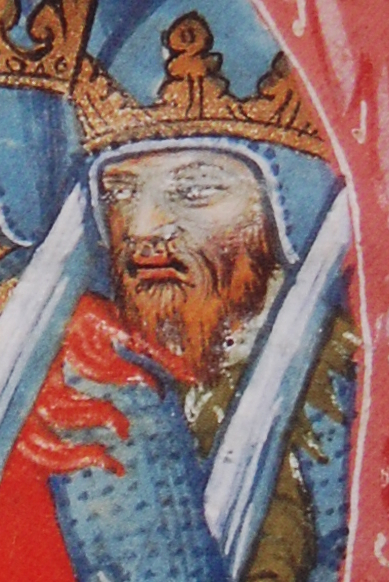
- Afonso IV depicted in Grant Cronica d'Espanya (1385-1393)

King of Portugal
- Reign: 7 January 1325 – 28 May 1357
- Predecessor: Denis
- Successor: Peter I
- Born: Afonso Dinis; 8 February 1291; Lisbon, Portugal
- Died: 28 May 1357 (aged 66); Lisbon, Portugal
- Burial: Lisbon Cathedral, Portugal
- Spouse: Beatrice of Castile (m. 1309)
- Issue Among others...: Maria, Queen of Castile; Peter I, King of Portugal; Eleanor, Queen of Aragon
- House: Burgundy
- Father: Denis of Portugal
- Mother: Elizabeth of Aragon

Afonso IV (Note: English: Alphonzo or Alphonse, or Affonso (Archaic Portuguese), Alfonso or Alphonso (Portuguese-Galician) or Alphonsus (Latin).) (Afonso Dinis; 8 February 1291 – 28 May 1357), called the Brave (Portuguese: o Bravo), was King of Portugal from 1325 until his death in 1357. He was the only legitimate son of King Denis of Portugal and Elizabeth of Aragon.

== Early life ==
Afonso, born in Lisbon, was the rightful heir to the Portuguese throne. However, he was not Denis' favourite son, even nearly beginning conflict against him. Instead, the old king preferred his illegitimate son, Afonso Sanches. The notorious rivalry between the half-brothers led to civil war several times. On 7 January 1325, Afonso IV's father died and he became king, whereupon he exiled his rival, Afonso Sanches, to Castile, and stripped him of all the lands and fiefdom given by their father. From Castile, Afonso Sanches orchestrated a series of attempts to usurp the crown. After a few failed attempts at invasion, the brothers signed a peace treaty, arranged by Afonso IV's mother, Elizabeth.

In 1309, Afonso married Beatrice of Castile, daughter of King Sancho IV of Castile and María de Molina. The first-born of this union was a daughter, Maria of Portugal.

== King of Portugal and Algarve ==
In 1325 Alfonso XI of Castile entered a child-marriage with Constanza Manuel of Castile, the daughter of one of his regents. Two years later, he had the marriage annulled so he could marry Afonso's daughter, Maria of Portugal. Maria became Queen of Castile in 1328 upon her marriage to Alfonso XI, who soon became involved publicly with a mistress. Constanza was imprisoned in a castle in Toro while her father, Don Juan Manuel, waged war against Alfonso XI until 1329. Eventually, the two reached a peaceful accord after mediation by Juan del Campo, Bishop of Oviedo; this secured Constanza's release from prison.

The public humiliation of his daughter led Afonso IV to have his son and heir, Peter I of Portugal, marry the no less aggrieved Castilian infanta, Constanza. Afonso subsequently started a war against Castile, peace arriving four years later, through the intervention of the infanta Maria herself. A year after the peace treaty was signed in Seville, Portuguese troops played an important role in defeating the Moors at the Battle of Río Salado in October 1340.

== Later life ==
Political intrigue marked the last part of Afonso IV's reign, although Castille was torn by civil war after Alfonso XI died. Henry of Trastámara challenged the new King Peter of Castile, who sent many Castilian nobles into exile in Portugal. Afonso's son Peter fell in love with his new wife's lady-in-waiting, Inês de Castro. Inês was the daughter of an important noble family from Galicia, with links (albeit illegitimate) to both the royal houses of Castile and Portugal. Her brothers were aligned with the Trastamara faction, and became favorites of Peter, much to the dismay of others at the Portuguese court, who considered them Castilian upstarts. When Constanza died weeks after giving birth to their third child, Peter began living openly with Inês, recognized all her children as his and refused to marry anyone other than Inês herself. His father refused to go to war again against Castile, hoping the heir apparent's infatuation would end, and tried to arrange another dynastic marriage for him.

The situation became worse as the years passed and the aging Afonso lost control over his court. His grandson and Peter's only legitimate son, Ferdinand I of Portugal, was a sickly child, while Inês' illegitimate children thrived. Worried about his legitimate grandson's life, and the growing power of Castile within Portugal's borders, Afonso ordered Inês de Castro first imprisoned in his mother's old convent in Coimbra, and then murdered in 1355. He expected his son to give in and marry a princess, but Peter became enraged upon learning of his wife's decapitation in front of their young children. Peter put himself at the head of an army and devastated the country between the Douro and the Minho rivers before he was reconciled to his father in early 1357. Afonso died almost immediately after, in Lisbon in May.

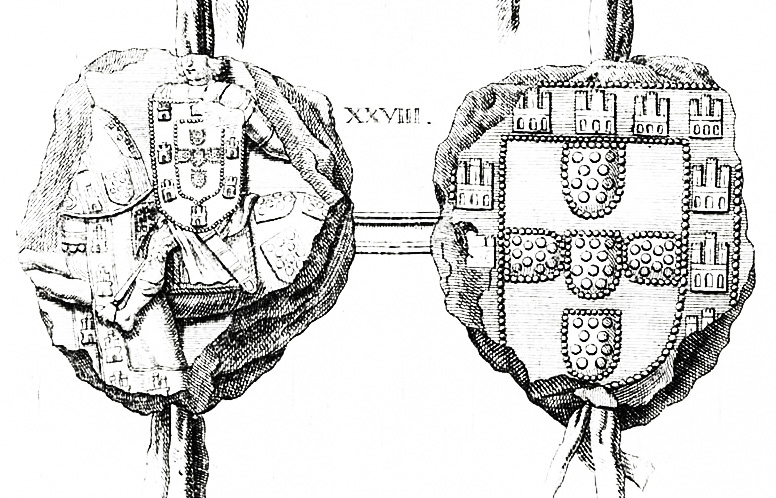
Seals of Afonso IV.

Afonso IV's nickname the Brave alludes to his martial exploits. However, his most important accomplishments were the relative peace enjoyed by the country during his long reign and the support he gave to the Portuguese Navy. Afonso granted public funding to raise a proper commercial fleet and ordered the first Portuguese maritime explorations. The conflict with Pedro, and the explorations he initiated, eventually became the foundation of the Portuguese national epic, Os Lusíadas by Luís de Camões.

The dramatic circumstances of the relationship between father, son and Inês was used as the basis for the plot of more than twenty operas and ballets. The story with its tragic dénouement is immortalized in several plays and poems in Portuguese, such as Os Lusíadas by Luís de Camões (canto iii, stanzas 118–135), and in Spanish, including Nise lastimosa and Nise laureada (1577) by Jerónimo Bermúdez, Reinar despues de morir by Luis Vélez de Guevara, as well as a play by French playwright Henry de Montherlant called La Reine morte (The Dead Queen). Mary Russell Mitford also wrote a drama based on the story entitled Inez de Castro. Inês de Castro is a novel by Maria Pilar Queralt del Hierro in Spanish and Portuguese.

== Marriage and descendants ==
On 12 September 1309, Afonso married Beatrice of Castile, daughter of Sancho IV of Castile, and María de Molina, and had four sons and three daughters. Afonso broke the tradition of previous kings and did not have any children out of wedlock. (Note: "We assume that after the marriage of dona Beatriz and don Alfonso IV, married life was harmonious (...) based on the fact that D. Afonso IV did not have any bastard children, thereby breaking a long family tradition". (loose translation)) (Note: "Perhaps since he had so many problems with those of his father, D. Afonso did not have any illegitimate children." (loose translation)) (Note: "There are no known bastard children of the king. Two possible explanations could be the ties of profound esteem, friendship and respect that existed because he had been raised and had lived from a very early age with his future wife or, perhaps, because he wanted to avoid that his heirs had the same problems that he had had with his bastard brothers". (loose translation))

- Maria of Portugal, Queen of Castile (1313 – 18 January 1357), was the wife of Alfonso XI of Castile, and mother of the future King Peter of Castile. Due to the affair of her husband with his mistress Eleanor de Guzmán "it was an unfortunate union from the start, contributing to dampening the relations of both kingdoms";
- Afonso (1315–1317), died in his infancy. Buried at the disappeared Convento das Donas of the Dominican Order in Santarém;
- Denis (born 12 February 1317), died a few months after his birth, and was buried in Alcobaça Monastery;
- Peter I of Portugal (8 April 1320 – 18 January 1367), the first surviving male offspring, he succeeded his father. When his wife Constanza died in 1345, Beatrice took care of the education of the two orphans, the infantes Maria and Ferdinand, who later reigned as King Ferdinand I of Portugal;
- Isabel (21 December 1324 – 11 July 1326), buried at the Monastery of Santa Clara-a-Velha in Coimbra;
- John (23 September 1326 – 21 June 1327), buried at the Monastery of São Dinis de Odivelas;
- Eleanor of Portugal, Queen of Aragon (1328–1348), born in the same year as her sister Maria's wedding, she married King Peter IV of Aragon in November 1347 and died a year after her marriage, succumbing to the Black Death.

== Bibliography ==
- González Mínguez, César (2004). "Fernando IV de Castilla (1295–1312): Perfil de un reinado" (PDF). Espacio, Tiempo y Forma, Serie III, Historia Medieval (in Spanish). No. 17. Madrid: Universidad Nacional de Educación a Distancia (UNED), Facultad de Geografía e Historia. pp. 223–244. ISSN 0214-9745.
- Lourenço Menino, Vanda Lisa (2008). "Cartas de Arras da Rainha D. Beatriz (1309–1359)" (PDF). Estudios humanísticos. Historia (in Portuguese). No. 7. León: Universidad de León: Servicio de Publicaciones. pp. 349–358. ISSN 1696-0300. Archived from the original (PDF) on 18 April 2014.
- Rodrigues Oliveira, Ana (2010). Rainhas medievais de Portugal. Dezassete mulheres, duas dinastias, quatro séculos de História (in Portuguese). Lisbon: A esfera dos livros. ISBN 978-989-626-261-7.
- Sotto Mayor Pizarro, José Augusto (1997). Linhagens Medievais Portuguesas: Genealogias e Estratégias (1279–1325) (in Portuguese). Oporto: Doctorate thesis, author's edition. hdl:10216/18023.
- Sousa, António Caetano de (1735). Historia Genealógica da Casa Real Portugueza (PDF) (in Portuguese). Lisbon: Lisboa Occidental, of. de Joseph Antonio Da Sylva, Impressor da Academia Real. OCLC 3910285.

Afonso IV of Portugal House of Burgundy Born: 8 February 1291 Died: 28 May 1357 Capetian dynasty
Regnal titles
| Preceded by Denis | King of Portugal; 1325–1357 | Succeeded by Peter I |
