= Eleanor of Portugal, Queen of Aragon =

Queen of Aragon from 1347 to 1348

Eleanor of Portugal
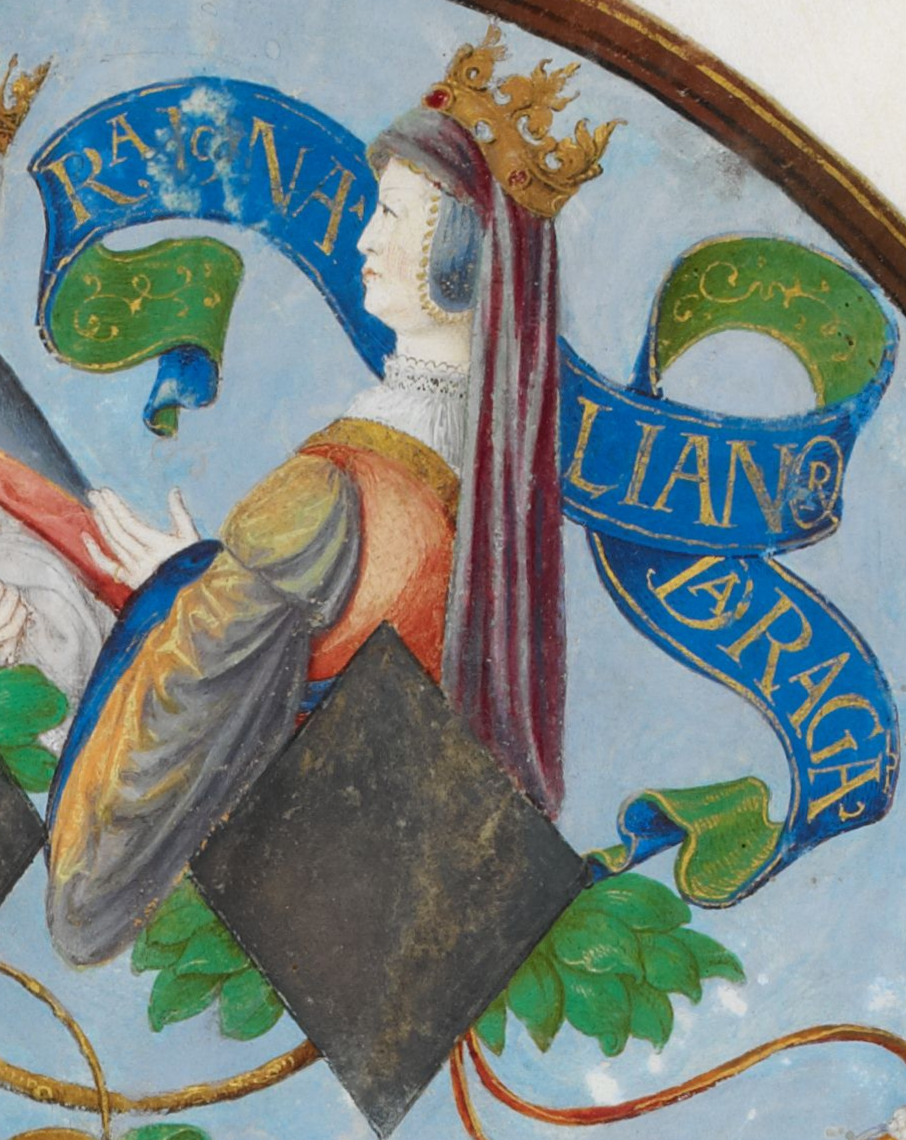
- Eleanor of Portugal, in Antonio de Hollanda's Genealogy of the Royal Houses of Spain and Portugal (1530–1534)

Queen consort of Aragon
- Tenure: 1347–1348
- Born: 3 February 1328; Kingdom of Portugal
- Died: 30 October 1348 (aged 20); Jérica, Crown of Aragon
- Burial: Poblet Monastery
- Spouse: Peter IV of Aragon
- House: Portuguese House of Burgundy
- Father: Alfonso IV of Portugal
- Mother: Beatrice of Castile

Eleanor of Portugal (1328 – 30 October 1348), was a Portuguese infanta by birth and Queen of Aragon from 1347 to 1348 as the second wife of King Peter IV.

The youngest daughter of King Afonso IV of Portugal and Beatrice of Castile, Leonor was the granddaughter of King Denis and Elizabeth of Aragon and of Sancho IV of Castile and Maria de Molina and sister of King Peter I of Portugal.

== Biography ==
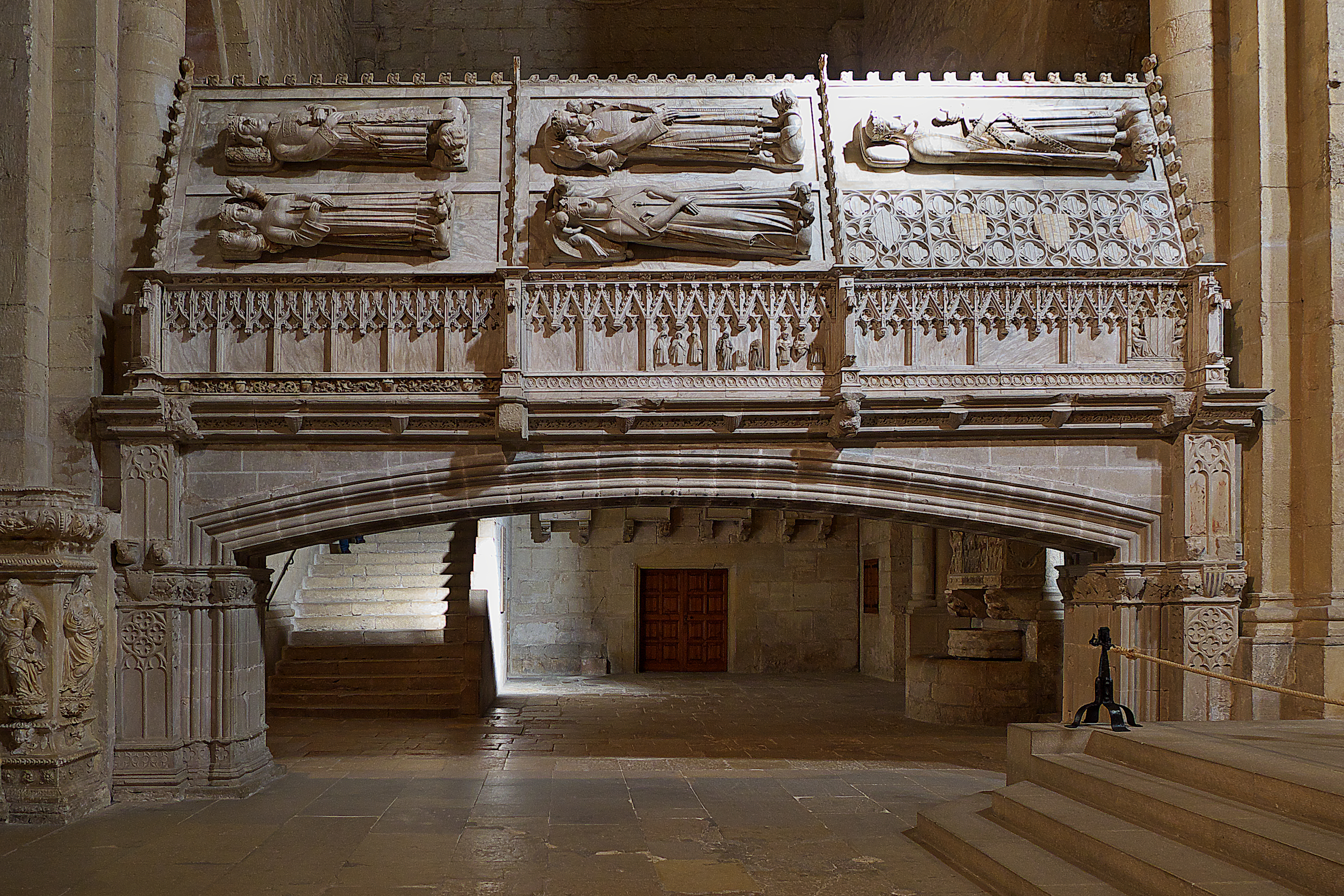
Royal sepulchres at Poblet Monastery

Little is known about her childhood. She is first mentioned when she was 18 years old when two kings vied for her hand in order to secure the support of Portugal: Alfonso XI of Castile who wanted her for his nephew Ferdinand of Aragon, and Peter IV of Aragon whom she finally married on 14 or 15 November 1347 in Barcelona, in the same year as the death of the king's first wife, Maria of Navarre. Eleanor was the first and only queen of Aragon who was born in Portugal.

She died on 30 October 1348, a year after her wedding, succumbing to the Black Death in Teruel while traveling to Jérica.

Even though some authors assert that she had a daughter named Beatrice who died as an infant and was raised by her maternal grandmother, including Jerónimo de Zurita and Rui de Pina, there was no issue from the marriage of the Portuguese infanta and the king of Aragon. She does not mention this child in her will who was mentioned in the two wills of her grandmother Queen Beatrice in 1357 and 1358 in which the queen asked that the remains of the infant Beatrice, probably an illegitimate child of King Peter I of Portugal, originally buried at the Convent of Saint Francis in Santarém, were to be placed at her tomb.

Queen Eleanor of Portugal was first buried in Jérica and in June 1350 her remains were transferred and buried in the Royal Pantheon of the Monastery of Poblet, as she had expressed in her will executed in September 1348.

== Ancestors ==
Ancestors of Eleanor of Portugal

16. Afonso II of Portugal
8. Afonso III of Portugal
17. Urraca of Castile
4. Denis, King of Portugal
18. Alfonso X of Castile
9. Beatrice of Castile
19. Mayor Guillén de Guzmán
2. Afonso IV of Portugal
20. James I of Aragon
10. Peter III of Aragon
21. Violant of Hungary
5. Elizabeth of Aragon
22. Manfred, King of Sicily
11. Constance of Sicily
23. Beatrice of Savoy
1. Eleanor of Portugal
24. Ferdinand III of Castile
12. Alfonso X of Castile
25. Elisabeth of Swabia
6. Sancho IV of Castile
26. James I of Aragon (= 20)
13. Violant of Aragon
27. Violant of Hungary (= 21)
3. Beatrice of Castile
28. Alfonso IX of León
14. Alfonso of Molina
29. Berengaria of Castile
7. María de Molina
30. Alfonso Téllez de Meneses
15. Mayor Alfonso de Meneses
31. María Yáñez de Lima

== Bibliography ==
- Almeida Rodrigues, Ana Maria de Seabra (2013). "Un destin interrompu: Aliénor de Portugal, brève reine d'Aragón". Les femmes dans l'espace nord-méditerranéen. Etudes Roussillonnaises. Revue d'Historie et d'archéologie Méditerranéennes (in French). Vol. XXV. Canet-en-Rousillon: Éditions Trabucaire. pp. 89–96. ISBN 978-2-84974-168-9.
- Rodrigues Oliveira, Ana (2010). Rainhas medievais de Portugal. Dezassete mulheres, duas dinastias, quatro séculos de História (in Portuguese). Lisbon: A esfera dos livros. ISBN 978-989-626-261-7.

Royal titles
Vacant Title last held by Maria of Navarre	Queen consort of Aragon; 1347–1348	Vacant Title next held by Eleanor of Sicily
