= Maria of Navarre =

Queen of Aragon from 1338 to 1347

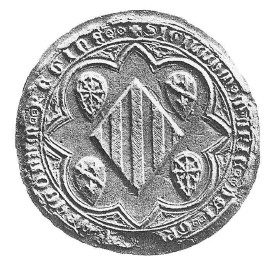
- The seal of Queen Maria

Queen consort of Aragon
- Tenure: 1338–1347
- Born: 1329
- Died: 29 April 1347 (aged 18)
- Spouse: Peter IV of Aragon (m. 1338)
- Issue: Constance, Queen of Sicily; Joanna, Countess of Ampurias
- House: Évreux
- Father: Philip of Évreux
- Mother: Joan II of Navarre

Maria of Navarre (French: Marie d'Évreux; 1329 – 29 April 1347) was Queen of Aragon from 1338 until her death as the first of four wives of Peter IV of Aragon.

== Childhood ==
Maria was the second child of Joan II of Navarre and Philip III of Navarre, born a year after their accession. Her parents, having established the House of Évreux as the new ruling dynasty in the Kingdom of Navarre, wanted to improve relations with their Iberian neighbours. In 1333 they negotiated a betrothal between Maria's elder sister, Joan, and Peter, then heir apparent to the throne of Aragon. Peter, who ascended the throne in January 1336, expressed a preference for the second daughter, however, which forced Joan to renounce her succession rights in favour of Maria.

== Queenship ==
The marriage contract was signed in her father's castle on Anet on 6 January 1336. It stipulated that, if her mother died leaving no sons, Maria or her children would inherit the crown of Navarre. The wedding ceremony took place near Zaragoza on 25 July 1337. Despite difficulties over the payment of her dowry, the relations of Maria's husband with her parents were excellent. As dower Maria received from Peter the towns of Jaca, Tarragona and Teruel. In 1338 the new queen made her joyous entry into Barcelona, capital of the Crown of Aragon.

Queen Maria was pious and a docile wife, probably having little in common with her husband. Their first child, Constance, was born in 1343, followed by Joanna in 1344 and Maria in 1345/6. The lack of a male heir for nine years of the marriage presented a problem. In 1347 Peter attempted to secure the succession for their eldest daughter, but was opposed by his brother James I, Count of Urgell, and the Aragonese Cortes. On 23 April in Valencia Queen Maria gave birth to a son, christened Peter, but the infant died the next day. Maria died of childbirth complications on 29 April. In her will she left her rights to Navarre to her son and then to her daughters, and expressed a wish to be buried in Poblet Monastery. She was interred instead in the Monastery of Saint Vincent in Valencia. Her widower remarried within a few months to Eleanor of Portugal.

Maria of Navarre House of Évreux Cadet branch of the House of Capet Born: circa 1329 Died: 29 April 1347
Royal titles
Vacant Title last held by Eleanor of Castile	Queen consort of Aragon; 1338–1347	Vacant Title next held by Eleanor of Portugal
Preceded by Constance of Aragon	Queen consort of Majorca; 1344–1347	Vacant Title next held by Eleanor of Portugal
