= Peter IV of Aragon =

King of Aragon from 1336 to 1387

Peter IV
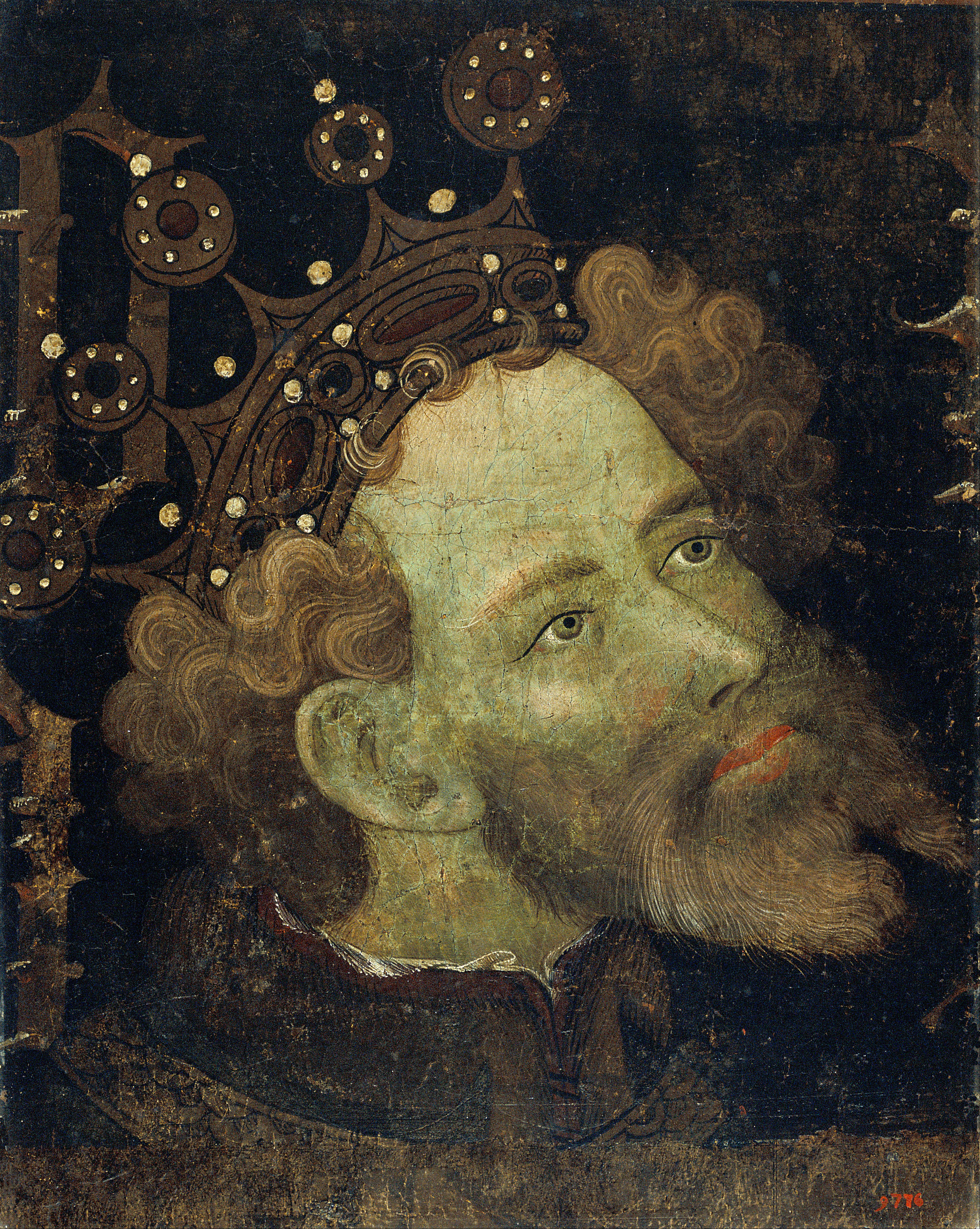
- Peter IV, King of Aragon by Gonzalo Pérez & Jaume Mateu (1427)

King of Aragon
- Reign: 24 January 1336 – 6 January 1387
- Coronation: 1336 (Zaragoza)
- Predecessor: Alfonso IV
- Successor: John I
- Born: 5 September 1319; Balaguer, Principality of Catalonia
- Died: 6 January 1387 (aged 67); Barcelona, Principality of Catalonia
- Spouses: Maria of Navarre (m. 1338; died 1347) Eleanor of Portugal (m. 1347; died 1348) Eleanor of Sicily (m. 1349; died 1375) Sibila de Fortià (m. 1377)
- Issue among others...: Constance, Queen of Sicily; Joanna, Countess of Empúries; John I, King of Aragon; Martin, King of Aragon; Eleanor, Queen of Castile; Isabella, Countess of Urgell
- House: Barcelona
- Father: Alfonso IV of Aragon
- Mother: Teresa d'Entença

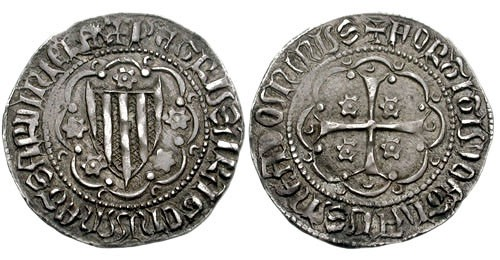
A Sardinian ducat (or principat), also called an Alfonsino, of Peter IV's reign. Note the four bars representing the Crown of Aragon.

Peter IV (Note: In other langes, Catalan: Pere, IPA: [ˈpeɾə]; Aragonese: Pero, IPA: [ˈpeɾo]; Spanish: Pedro, IPA: [ˈpeðɾo]. In Catalan, he may also be nicknamed el del punyalet: "he of the little dagger".) (Catalan: Pere IV d'Aragó; Aragonese; Pero IV d'Aragón; 5 September 1319 – 6 January 1387), called the Ceremonious (Catalan: El Cerimoniós; Aragonese: el Ceremonioso), was from 1336 until his death the king of Aragon, Sardinia-Corsica, and Valencia, and count of Barcelona. In 1344, he deposed James III of Majorca and made himself King of Majorca.

His reign was occupied with attempts to strengthen the crown against the Union of Aragon and other such devices of the nobility, with their near constant revolts, and with foreign wars, in Sardinia, Sicily, the Mezzogiorno, Greece, and the Balearics. His wars in Greece made him Duke of Athens and Neopatria in 1381.

== Succession conflicts ==
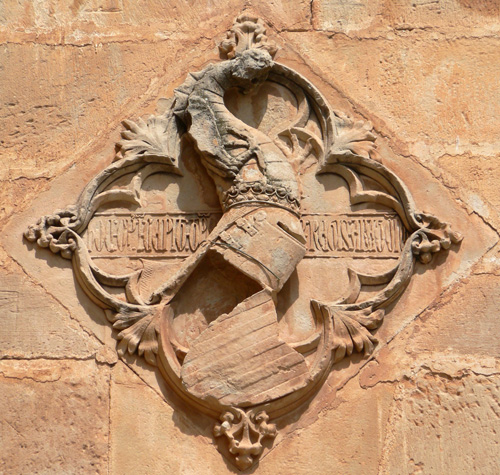
Coat of arms of Peter IV at the Royal Gate of Poblet Monastery

Peter was born at Balaguer, the eldest son and heir of Alfons IV, then Count of Urgell, and his first wife, Teresa d'Entença. Peter was designated to inherit all of his father's title save that of Urgell, which went to his younger brother James.

Upon succeeding his father he called a corts in Zaragoza for his coronation. He crowned himself, disappointing the Archbishop of Zaragoza and thus rejecting the surrender Peter II had made to the Papacy in an otherwise traditional ceremony. According to his own later reports, this act caused him some "distress". He did, however, affirm the liberties and privileges of Aragon. Also while he was at Zaragoza, an embassy from Castile had met him and asked that he promise to uphold the donations of land his father had made to his stepmother Eleanor, but he refused to give a clear answer as to the legitimacy of the donations.

After the festivities in Zaragoza, Peter began on his way to Valencia to receive coronation there. En route, he stopped at Lleida to affirm the Usatges and Constitutions of the Principality of Catalonia and receive the homage of his Catalan subjects. This offended Barcelona, at which the ceremony had usually been performed, and the citizens of that city complained to the king, who claimed that Lleida was on his way to Valencia. While in Valencia, he decided on the case of his stepmother's inheritance, depriving her of income and outlawing her Castilian protector, Peter Ponce of León and Jérica. However, Jérica had enough supporters within Peter's domains that Peter was unable to maintain his position and in 1338, through papal mediation, Jérica was reconciled to the king and Eleanor received her land and jurisdictional rights. Peter was largely forced to capitulate by a new invasion from Morocco aimed at Castile and Valencia.

In 1338 he married Maria, second daughter of Philip III and Joan II of Navarre. In May 1339, he allied with Alfonso XI of Castile against Morocco, but his contribution of a fleet had no effect at the pivotal Battle of Río Salado (October 1340).

== Conquest of Majorca ==
Early on in his reign, a thorn in Peter's side had been James III of Majorca, his brother-in-law, the husband of his sister Constance. James had twice postponed performing the ceremony of homage to Peter, his feudal overlord, and when he finally performed it in 1339, it was on his terms. The rising economic star of Majorca, whose merchants were establishing independent markets and gaining trading privileges in the western Mediterranean, threatened the supremacy of Barcelona. The gold coinage of Majorca and the diplomatic equality granted it by the powers of France and Italy irked Peter further, while James also allied with Abu Al-Hassan, the king of Morocco and Peter's enemy. Peter's outrage, however, was given no outlet until 1341, when James, threatened with invasion by the French over disputed rights to the Lordship of Montpellier, called on his suzerain Aragon for aid. In order not to offend France nor to support James, Peter summoned the king of Majorca to a cort at Barcelona, to which he knew he would not come, and when James or a representative of his failed to appear, Peter declared himself free from the obligations of an overlord to James.

Peter then opened a legal process against James with the intent of dispossessing him of his kingdom. He alleged that the circulation of James' coinage in the Counties of Roussillon and Cerdagne to be an infringement on the royal right of monopoly of coinage. This was open to question, considering the ancient customs of Roussillon and Cerdagne, but Peter was prepared to move forward anyway. The interference of Pope Clement VI, however, granted James a hearing in Barcelona in front of papal delegates. Peter, for his part, spread rumours that James was seeking to capture him. James, fearing that Peter would stoop to invading Majorca and seizing it by force, returned to the island to prepare its defence. In February 1343, Peter declared James a contumacious vassal and his kingdom and lands forfeit.

The legal process being terminated, Peter went to war, on the advice that the islanders were burdened by taxes and would readily rise in his support. In May, a fleet which had been blockading Algeciras landed at Majorca and quickly defeated James' army at the Battle of Santa Ponça. Peter received the submission of all the Balearics and confirmed the privileges of the islands as they had been under James I. Though James sued for peace and Pope Clement attempted to mediate it, Peter returned to Barcelona prepared to invade Roussillon and Cerdagne. After these were finally conquered in 1344 James surrendered on a safe conduct, only to find himself ignominiously reduced to the status of a petty lord. In March, Peter had declared his realm incorporated into the Crown of Aragon in perpetuity and ceremoniously had himself crowned its king.

== Military career ==
Arms of Peter IV of Aragon.

By the Pact of Madrid, Peter was constrained to aid Alfonso XI of Castile in his successful attack on Algeciras (1344) and his failed attempt on Gibraltar (1349) by defending against a Moroccan counterattack.

As Peter had no male issue, his brother Count James of Urgell was the presumptive heir to the Aragonese throne. Peter grew to mistrust the intentions of James over time. Peter decided that he would instead name his daughter Constance as his heir presumptive notwithstanding the precedents established by James I and Alfonso IV to exclude females from the throne. To this end, he demanded that James cede his post as procurator general, a position which, by tradition, was reserved for the second in line to the Aragonese throne. James fled to Zaragoza where he gained the favor of certain nobles who wished to reassert their powers via the monarch. Peter eventually succumbed to the pressure to hold a cortes in Zaragoza where he made numerous concessions of royal authority to quell a rebellion he was not yet in a position to crush. One of such concessions was to revoke his attempt to name Constance as heir, and to restore James as procurator general. To avert additional damage, Peter dissolved the corts on the premise that he had to address a crisis developing in Sardinia. Not long thereafter, while Peter was in Catalonia, James suddenly died. Many suspected Peter of having arranged to have James poisoned. Deprived of their leader, the Union of Aragon was greatly weakened.

Venturing next to Valencia, Peter encountered the nascent Valencian Union which had taken its cue from its counterpart in Aragon. At Murviedro (Sagunt), Peter was forced to name his stepbrother Ferran as the new procurator general. Additional concessions of royal authority were made to appease the Unionists. This time when he attempted to leave a bad situation, Peter was held under guard in Valencia as a prisoner of the Union. Suffering perhaps his greatest humiliation, he and his queen were forced to dance with the common folk to show his subservience. Ironically, his salvation was the Black Death. Valencia was felled by this plague in May 1348, enabling Peter to escape amid the confusion. Assembling an army of increasingly powerful royalists in Aragon, Peter attacked the unionist forces at the Battle of Epila on 21 July 1348. Peter won a complete victory. Proceeding to Saragossa, Peter executed only thirteen Union leaders. By fourteenth century standards, this was a great display of magnanimity. Not the same can be said for the fate of Valencia. After being persuaded not to burn the entire city and sow it with salt, many were executed. Of particular note, he had the bell that the Valencian Union rang to summon its meetings melted down. The molten metal from the bell was then poured down the throats of the Union leaders so that they "should taste its liquor."

In 1356, he engaged with Peter I of Castile in what was called the "War of the Two Peters". It ended in 1375 with the Treaty of Almazan, without a winner due to the Black Death and several natural disasters.

Throughout his reign, Peter IV had frequent conflicts with the inquisitor general of Aragon, Nicolas Eymerich.

In 1349, James invaded Majorca, but was soundly defeated by Peter's troops at the Battle of Llucmajor, in which he died. After James' death, Peter allowed James IV, his successor, to retain his royal title on purely formal terms until his death in 1375. After that date, Peter assumed the title. Majorca remained one of the component crowns of the Crown of Aragon until the Nova Planta decrees.

Peter died in Barcelona, aged 67.

== Generalitat ==
At the Catalan Courts celebrated at Barcelona, Vilafranca del Penedès and Cervera in 1358–1359, Peter instituted the Deputation of the General or Generalitat. Castile had recently invaded Aragon and Valencia and the cortes decided to streamline the government by designating a dozen deputies to oversee the fiscal and material policies of the Crown. The first "President of the Generalitat" was Berenguer de Cruïlles, Bishop of Girona (1359).

Toward the end of his reign (c. 1370) Peter ordered the compilation of the Chronicle of Sant Joan de la Penya to record the historical basis for the authority of the crown.

== Relationship with Jews ==
According to historical record, Peter IV of Aragon and his Jewish physician had a friendly disputation regarding the question of why the Jews were not allowed to drink kosher wine touched by a Christian. Thereupon the physician had water brought to wash the king's feet, of which he then drank to demonstrate that the fear of impurity was not the reason of the prohibition.

In 1350, in response to the black plague, Peter IV ordered the mayor of Lleida to construct a new Jewish cemetery, as the existing one became overwhelmed by the number of new corpses.

== Marriage and children ==
His first marriage, on 23 July 1338 in Alagón, was to Maria (1329 – 29 April 1347), daughter of Philip III of Navarre and Joan II of Navarre. They had four children:

- Constance (1343 – July 1363), who married King Frederick III of Sicily.
- Joanna (7 November 1344 – 1385), who married Count John of Ampurias.
- Maria (1345/6 – 3 June 1348).
- Peter (born and died 28 April 1347).

His second marriage, on 15 November 1347 in Barcelona, was to Eleanor (1328 – 29 October 1348), daughter of Afonso IV of Portugal. She died one year later of the Black Death.

His third marriage, on 27 August 1349 in Valencia, was to Eleanor (1325 – 20 April 1375), daughter of Peter II of Sicily. They had four children:

- John I (27 December 1350 – 19 May 1396).
- Martin I (1356 – 31 May 1410).
- Eleanor (20 February 1358 – 13 September 1382), who married John I of Castile and was the mother of Ferdinand I of Aragon.
- Alfonso (May or June 1362 – 1364).

His last marriage, on 11 October 1377 in Barcelona, was to Sibila (? – 4 or 24 November 1406), daughter of Bernat of Fortià and widow of Artal of Foces, who was previously his mistress. They had three children:

- Alfonso (1376 – 1377). Legitimized in 1377, Count of Morella.
- Peter (born and died April 1379).
- Isabella (1380 – 1424), married Count James II of Urgell and was mother of Isabella of Urgell, Duchess of Coimbra. Through Isabella, Peter and Sibila are ancestors to Joana, Princess of Portugal, and John II of Portugal.

== In popular culture ==
- Peter IV is portrayed by the actor Tacho González in the 2018 Spanish television series, Cathedral of the Sea. The aftermath of his death is dealt with in the 2022 sequel, Heirs to the Land.

== Bibliography ==
- Bisson, Thomas N. (1986). The Medieval Crown of Aragon: A Short History. Oxford: Clarendon Press. ISBN 0-19-821987-3.
- Chaytor, H. J. (1933). A History of Aragon and Catalonia]. London: Methuen.
- Hulme, Edward Maslin (1915). The Renaissance: The Protestant Revolution and The Catholic Reformation in Continental Europe. The Century Co.
- Setton, Kenneth M. (1975). Catalan Domination of Athens 1311–1380 (Revised ed.). London: Variorum.
- Setton, Kenneth M. (1953). "Archbishop Pierre d'Ameil in Naples and the Affair of Aimon III of Geneva (1363-1364)". Speculum. 28 (4 (Oct.)): 643–691. doi:10.2307/2849199. JSTOR 2849199. S2CID 161444650.
- Woodacre, Elena (2013). The Queens Regnant of Navarre: Succession, Politics, and Partnership, 1274-1512. Palgrave Macmillan. ISBN 978-1-137-33914-0.

Peter IV of Aragon House of Barcelona Cadet branch of the House of Barcelona Born: 5 September 1319 Died: 6 January 1387
Regnal titles
Preceded by Alfonso IV	King of Aragon, Valencia, Sardinia and Corsica; Count of Barcelona; 1336–1387	Succeeded by John I
Preceded by James III	King of Majorca; Count of Roussillon and Cerdagne; 1344–1387	Succeeded by John I
Preceded by Maria	Duke of Athens and Neopatras; 1379–1387; With: Maria of Sicily	Succeeded by Nerio I Acciaioli
