= Alfonso XI of Castile =

King of Castile, León and Galicia from 1312 to 1350

Alfonso XI
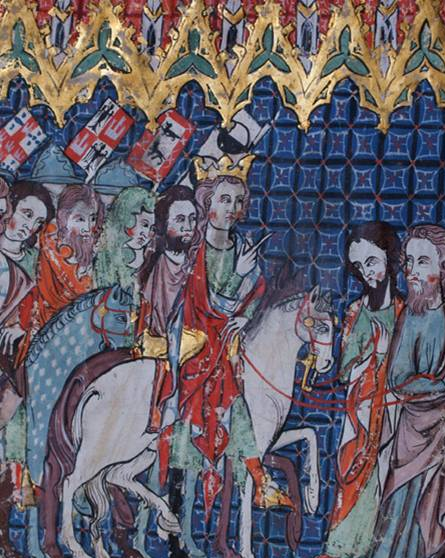
- Detail of a contemporary depiction in the Book of the Coronation of the Kings of Castile (14th century)

King of Castile and León
- Reign: 7 September 1312 – 26 March 1350
- Predecessor: Ferdinand IV
- Successor: Peter
- Born: 13 August 1311; Salamanca, Crown of Castile
- Died: 26 March 1350 (aged 38); Gibraltar, Emirate of Granada
- Burial: Royal Collegiate Church of Saint Hippolytus
- Spouses: Constanza Manuel (m. 1325; ann. 1327) Maria of Portugal (m. 1328)
- Issue among others...: Peter; Illegitimate: Henry II; Fadrique, Lord of Haro; Tello, Lord of Aguilar de Campoo; Sancho, Count of Alburquerque
- House: Castilian House of Ivrea
- Father: Ferdinand IV of Castile
- Mother: Constance of Portugal

Alfonso XI (11 August 1311 – 26 March 1350), called the Avenger (el Justiciero), was King of Castile and León. He was the son of Ferdinand IV of Castile and Constance of Portugal. Upon his father's death in 1312, several disputes ensued over who would hold regency, which were resolved in 1313.

Once Alfonso was declared an adult in 1325, he began a reign that would serve to strengthen royal power and became known for his victory in the Battle of Rio Salado. While leading a siege against Yusuf I of Granada, he died of the plague in Gibraltar.

== Life ==
=== Minority ===
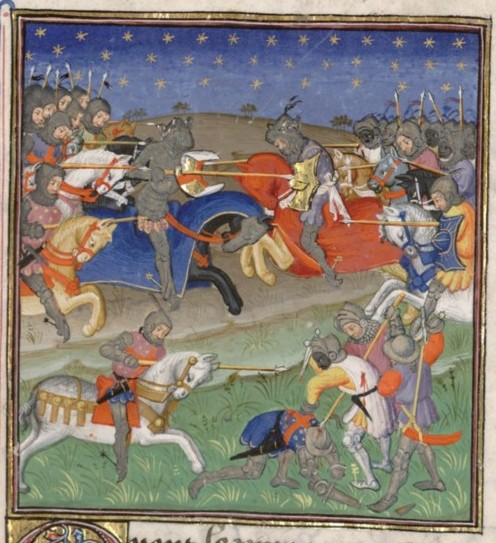
Alfonso XI of Castile attacks the Muslim Moors led by Muhammed IV, Sultan of the emirate of Granada.

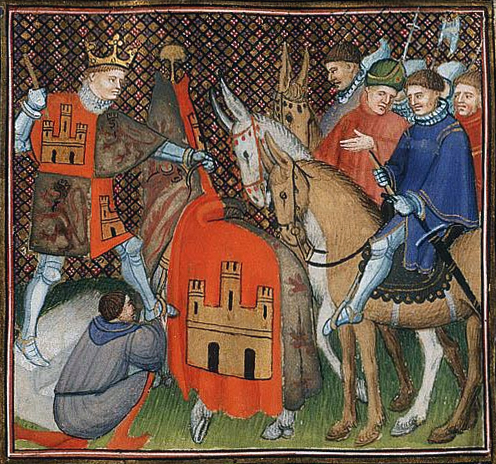
Depiction in an illumination of Froissart's chronicles, c. 1410

Born on 13 August 1311 in Salamanca, he was the son of King Ferdinand IV of Castile and Constance of Portugal. His father died when Alfonso was one year old. His grandmother, María de Molina, his mother Constance, his granduncle Infante John of Castile, son of King Alfonso X of Castile and uncle Infante Peter of Castile, son of King Sancho IV assumed the regency. His mother died first on 18 November 1313, followed by Infantes John and Peter during a military campaign against Granada in 1319 at the Disaster of the Vega, which left Dowager Queen María as the only regent until her death on 1 July 1321.

Alfonso inherited the throne at a time of instability within the region; population decline, reductions in the royal treasury, and increasingly ambitious regents caused numerous problems during his early reign.

After the death of the Infantes John and Peter in 1319, Philip (son of Sancho IV and María de Molina, thus brother of Infante Peter), Juan Manuel (the king's second-degree uncle by virtue of being Ferdinand III's grandson) and Juan the One-eyed (his second-degree uncle, son of John of Castile who died in 1319) split the kingdom among themselves according to their aspirations for regency, even as it was being looted by Moors and the rebellious nobility.

A 14th century chronicle mentioned his appearance as "...King Alfonso was not very tall but well proportioned, and he was rather strong and had fair skin and hair."

=== Majority ===
His effective reign began in August 1325 when he was sworn in as king as he was proclaimed to have reached the age of majority in the Cortes of Valladolid. Following a ritual that took him to Santiago de Compostela and to the monastery of Las Huelgas in Burgos, his self-crowning took place in 1332.

As soon as he took the throne, he began working hard to strengthen royal power by dividing his enemies. His early display of ruthless rulership skills included the unhesitant execution of possible opponents. Alfonso XI ordered the assassination of Juan the One-eyed in Toro in the 1326 feast of All Saints, along with two of the latter's knights, luring the former with promises of reconciliation.

He managed to extend the limits of his kingdom to the Strait of Gibraltar after the important victory at the Battle of Río Salado against the Marinid dynasty in 1340 and the conquest of Algeciras in 1344. Once that conflict was resolved, he redirected all his Reconquista efforts to fighting the Moorish king of Granada.

During his reign a political reform in the municipal government took place, with the substitution of the concejos abiertos by the regimientos. He fostered the issuance of cartas pueblas as strategy for the demographic strengthening in the borderland areas.

He is variously known among Castilian kings as the Avenger or the Implacable, and as "He of Río Salado." The first two names he earned by the ferocity with which he repressed the disorders caused by the nobles during his long minority; the third by his victory in the Battle of Río Salado over the last formidable Marinid invasion of the Iberian Peninsula in 1340.

Alfonso XI never went to the extreme lengths of his son Peter of Castile, but he could be bloody in his methods. He killed for reasons of state without any form of trial. He openly neglected his wife, Maria of Portugal, and indulged a scandalous passion for Eleanor of Guzman, who bore him ten children.

Stricken with plague during the 1349–1350 siege of Gibraltar, Alfonso died in the night of 25–26 March 1350 (some sources put the date wrongfully at 27 March) becoming one of the most prominent victims of the Black Death. The Castilian forces withdrew from Gibraltar, with some of the defenders coming out to watch. Out of respect, Alfonso's rival Yusuf I of Granada ordered his army and his commanders in the border regions not to attack the Castilian procession as it traveled with the king's body to Seville.

== Marriage and issue ==
Alfonso XI first married Constanza Manuel in 1325, but had the union annulled two years later. His second marriage, in 1328, was to his double first cousin Maria of Portugal, daughter of Alfonso IV of Portugal. They had:

- Two sons buried with their mother in the Royal Monastery of San Clemente in Seville. One of them, the firstborn Fernando, died a few months after birth.
- Peter of Castile (1334–1369), King of Castile.

By his mistress, Eleanor of Guzmán, he had ten children:

- Pedro Alfonso (1331/1332–1338), 1st Lord of Aguilar de Campoo;
- Sancho Alfonso (1332/1333–1342), 1st Lord of Ledesma;
- Henry II of Castile (1333/1334–1379), King of Castile (1369–1379)
- Fadrique Alfonso (1333/1334–1358), Henry's twin brother, he was Master of the Order of Santiago and 1st Lord of Haro;
- Fernando Alfonso (1334–c. 1350), 2nd Lord of Ledesma;
- Tello Alfonso (1337–1370), 2nd Lord of Aguilar de Campoo;
- Juan Alfonso (1340–1359), 1st Lord of Jerez de los Caballeros;
- Juana Alfonso (1342–after 1376), Lady of Trastámara due to her marriage in 1354 to Fernando Ruiz de Castro. The marriage was annulled and in 1366 she married Felipe de Castro;
- Sancho Alfonso (1343–1375), 1st Count of Alburquerque;
- Pedro Alfonso (1345–1359)

After Alfonso's death, his widow Maria had Eleanor arrested and later killed.

== Popular culture ==
He was depicted in the 1802 play Alfonso, King of Castile by the British writer Matthew Lewis. It was first staged at London's Covent Garden Theatre with Charles Murray in the title role.

== Ancestry ==
Ancestors of Alfonso XI of Castile

8. Alfonso X of Castile
4. Sancho IV of Castile
9. Violant of Aragon
2. Ferdinand IV of Castile
10. Alfonso of Molina
5. María de Molina
11. Mayor Alfonso Tellez
1. Alfonso XI of Castile
12. Afonso III of Portugal
6. Denis of Portugal
13. Beatrice of Castile
3. Constance of Portugal
14. Peter III of Aragon
7. Elizabeth of Aragon
15. Constance of Sicily

== Bibliography ==
- Aurell, Jaume (2016). "La práctica de las autocoronaciones reales. Análisis histórico e implicaciones simbólicas" (PDF). El acceso al trono: concepción y ritualización. Gobierno de Navarra, Departamento de Cultura, Turismo y Relaciones Institucionales = Nafarroako Gobernua, Kultura, Kirol eta Gazteria Departamentua. pp. 287–302. ISBN 978-84-235-3452-4.
- Chapman, Charles Edward and Rafael Altamira, A history of Spain, The MacMillan Company, 1922.
- Coleman, Joyce (2007). "Philippa of Lancaster, Queen of Portugal--and Patron of the Gower Translations?". In Bullón-Fernández, María (ed.). England and Iberia in the Middle Ages, 12th-15th Century: Cultural, Literary, and Political Exchanges. Palgrave Macmillan. pp. 135–166.
- Fernández-Puertas, Antonio (April 1997). "The Three Great Sultans of al-Dawla al-Ismā'īliyya al-Naṣriyya Who Built the Fourteenth-Century Alhambra: Ismā'īl I, Yūsuf I, Muḥammad V (713–793/1314–1391)". Journal of the Royal Asiatic Society. Third Series. 7 (1). London: Cambridge University Press on behalf of Royal Asiatic Society of Great Britain and Ireland: 1–25. doi:10.1017/S1356186300008294. JSTOR 25183293. S2CID 154717811.
- García Fernández, Manuel (2012). "Alfonso XI y Andalucía. Un rey en tierra de frontera (1312-1350)" (PDF). Andalucía en la Historia (38). Seville: Universidad de Sevilla: 41–47.
- León-Sotelo, María & González Crespo, Esther (1986). "Notas para el itinerario de Alfonso XI en el periodo de 1344 a 1350". En la España Medieval (in Spanish). Vol. 8, no. 5. Complutense University of Madrid. pp. 575–589. ISSN 0214-3038.
- Previte-Orton, C.W. (1960). The Shorter Cambridge Medieval History. Vol. II: The Twelfth Century to the Renaissance. Cambridge at the University Press.
- Ruiz, Teofilo F. (2004). From Heaven to Earth: The Reordering of Castilian Society, 1150-1350. Princeton & Oxford: Princeton University Press. ISBN 0-691-00121-9.
- Ruiz, Teofilo F. (2011). Spain's Centuries of Crisis, 1300 - 1474. Wiley.
- Ruiz, Teofilo F. (2015). "Towards a Symbolic History of Alfonso XI of Castile: Power, Ceremony and Triumph". In Todesca, James J. (ed.). The Emergence of León-Castile c.1065–1500: Essays Presented to J.F. O'Callaghan. Ashgate Publishing. ISBN 978-1-4094-2035-4.
- Torres Fontes, Juan (1987). "Evolución del Concejo de Murcia en la Edad Media" (PDF). Murgetana (71): 5–47. ISSN 0213-0939.
- Medieval Iberia: an encyclopedia, Ed. E. Michael Gerli and Samuel G. Armistead, Routledge, 2003.
- Borrero Fernández, Mercedes (1991). El Real Monasterio de San Clemente: Un monasterio cisterciense en la Sevilla Medieval. Sevilla: Comisaría de la Ciudad de Sevilla para 1992, Ayuntamiento de Sevilla. ISBN 84-7952-013-2.
- Guillén, Fernando Arias (2020). The Triumph of an Accursed Lineage: Kingship in Castile from Alfonso X to Alfonso XI (1252-1350). Routledge.

Alfonso XI of Castile Castilian House of Ivrea Cadet branch of the House of Ivrea Born: 13 August 1311 Died: 26 March 1350
Regnal titles
Preceded by Ferdinand IV	King of Castile and León; 1312–1350	Succeeded by Peter
