= Sancho of Castile, Count of Alburquerque =

Sancho Alfonso
- 1st Count of Alburquerque
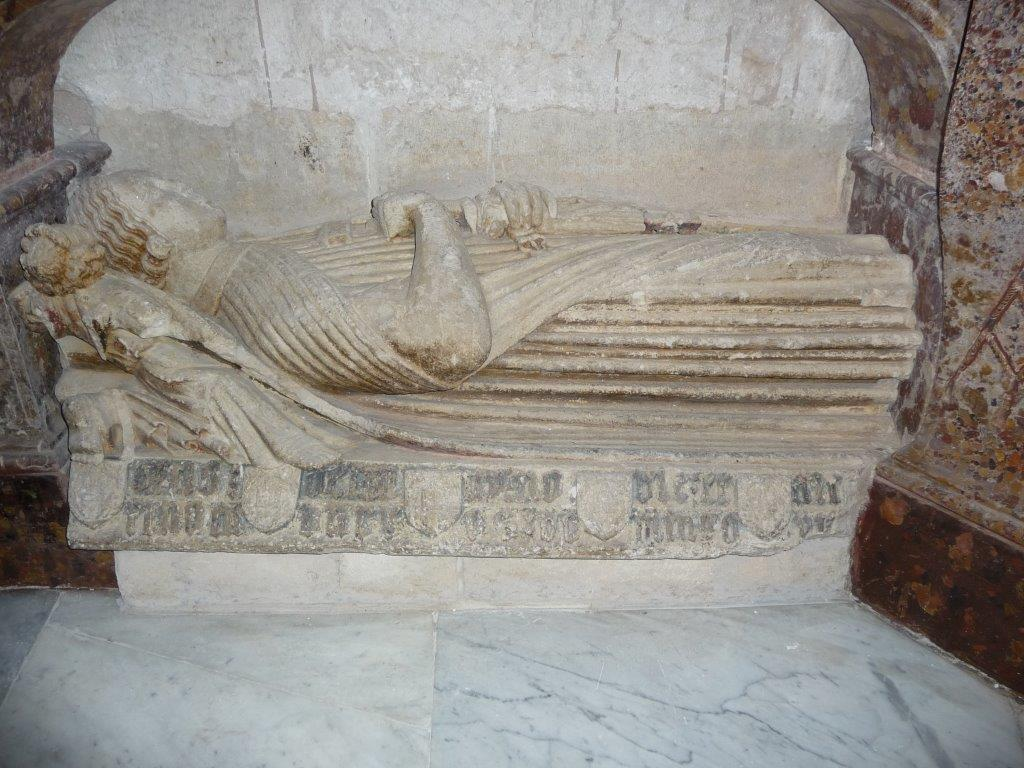
- Sancho's tomb in the Cathedral of Burgos
- Born: 1342; Sevilla
- Died: 19 February 1374 (aged 31–32); Burgos
- Spouse: Beatrice of Portugal
- Issue: Eleanor, Queen of Aragon; Leonor Sánchez (illeg.)
- House: Castilian House of Ivrea
- Father: Alfonso XI of Castile
- Mother: Leonor de Guzmán

Sancho Alfonso of Castile (1342–1374), known in Spanish as Don Sancho Alfonso de Castilla, was Infante of Castile, 1st Count of Alburquerque.

He was born in Seville as the ninth of the ten illegitimate children of Alfonso XI of Castile and Leonor de Guzmán.

He participated in a revolt of the Castilian nobles against the despotic rule of his brother, Peter of Castile. Together with his brothers Henry (future Henry II of Castile), Fadrique and Tello, Sancho fought against his half-brother Peter.

In April 1366, his brother Henry named him Count of Alburquerque, lord of Ledesma, Alba de Liste, Medellín, Tiedra and Montalbán. These lands had been confiscated from the only son of João Afonso de Albuquerque and 7th Lord of Alburquerque. In 1373, Sancho married Beatrice of Portugal, daughter of Peter I of Portugal and Inês de Castro. They had one daughter: Eleanor of Alburquerque, who married Ferdinand I of Aragon.

He also had an illegitimate daughter, Leonor Sánchez de Castilla, who had a liaison with her first cousin Fadrique de Castilla, 1st Duke of Benavente, illegitimate son of Henry II of Castile with mistress Beatriz Ponce de León.

== Ancestors ==
Ancestors of Sancho of Castile, Count of Alburquerque

16. Alfonso X of Castile
8. Sancho IV of Castile
17. Violant of Aragon
4. Ferdinand IV of Castile
18. Alfonso of Molina
9. María de Molina
19. Mayor Alfonso de Meneses
2. Alfonso XI of Castile
20. Afonso III of Portugal
10. Denis, King of Portugal
21. Beatrice of Castile
5. Constance of Portugal
22. Peter III of Aragon
11. Elizabeth of Aragon
23. Constance of Sicily
1. Sancho Alfonso
24. Pedro Núñez de Guzmán
12. Álvar Pérez de Guzmán
25. Teresa Rodríguez Brizuela
6. Pedro Núñez de Guzmán
26. Gonzalo Ruiz Girón
13. María González Girón
27. Elvira Díaz de Castañeda
3. Leonor de Guzmán
28. Pedro Ponce de Cabrera
14. Fernán Pérez Ponce de León
29. Aldonza Alfonso de León
7. Juana Ponce de León
30. Gutierre Suárez de Meneses
15. Urraca Gutiérrez de Meneses
31. Elvira Anes de Sousa

== Sources ==
- Lopes, Fernão (1988). The English in Portugal, 1367-87: Extracts from the Chronicles of Dom Fernando and Dom Joao. Translated by Lomax, Derek W.; Oakley, R.J. Aris & Phillips Ltd.
- de Pina Baleiras, Isabel (2020). "Portugal, 1385: a people's choice or coup d'etat?". In Rodrigues, Ana Maria S. A.; Silva, Manuela Santos; Spangler, Jonathan (eds.). Dynastic change : legitimacy and gender in medieval and early modern monarchy. Routledge.
- Francisco de Moxó y de Montoliu, Estudios sobre las relaciones entre Aragón y Castilla, 1997, ISBN 84-7820-387-7
