= Maria of Portugal, Queen of Castile =

Queen of Castile and León from 1328 to 1350

Maria of Portugal
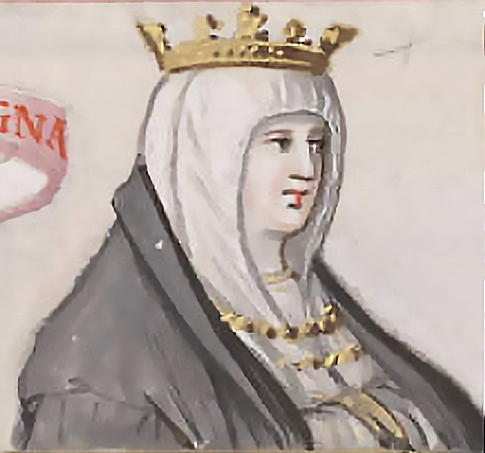
- Depiction in the Liber Genealogiae Regum Hispaniae

Queen consort of Castile and León
- Tenure: 1328–1350
- Born: 9 February 1313
- Died: 18 January 1357 (aged 43); Évora
- Burial: Royal Monastery of San Clemente in Seville
- Spouse: Alfonso XI of Castile (m. 1328; died 1350)
- Issue: Peter of Castile
- House: Portuguese House of Burgundy
- Father: Afonso IV of Portugal
- Mother: Beatrice of Castile

Maria of Portugal (Portuguese pronunciation: [mɐˈɾiɐ]) (9 February 1313 – 18 January 1357) was a Portuguese princess who became Queen of Castile upon her marriage to Alfonso XI in 1328. She was the eldest daughter of King Afonso IV of Portugal and Beatrice of Castile.

== Life ==
In 1328, Maria married Alfonso XI of Castile. As part of the dower, King Alfonso gave her Guadalajara, Talavera de la Reina and Olmedo.

The relationship between Maria and Alfonso was unhappy: Alfonso had a relationship with Leonor de Guzmán who gave him ten children, including the future King Henry II of Castile. Maria did not participate in the affairs of the court, being replaced by the royal mistress, and it is quite likely that she spent long periods secluded at the Royal Monastery of San Clemente in Seville.

In 1335, Maria returned to her father in Évora, who demanded that Alfonso separated from Leonor. In the peace treaty of Seville in July 1340, Alfonso agreed to have Leonor sent to a convent, thereby securing the support of the King of Portugal in the Battle of Río Salado which was fought on 30 October 1340, although, once the military conflict had been resolved, he returned to his mistress and did not fulfill the promise he had made to the Portuguese monarch.

At Alfonso's death, on 26 March 1350, Maria secured a power position by exerting influence upon the leader of her son's council, João Afonso de Albuquerque. She ordered the murder of her husband's mistress, Leonor de Guzmán, in the spring of 1351 in Talavera de la Reina. Maria also participated in the rebellion against her son in 1354. On 16 January 1356, when she was in the Alcázar of Toro, King Peter, accompanied by several squires, entered the place and ordered the killing of several nobles who accompanied the Queen, including her mayordomo Martim Afonso Telo de Meneses. After this, she returned to Portugal.

== Death and Burial ==
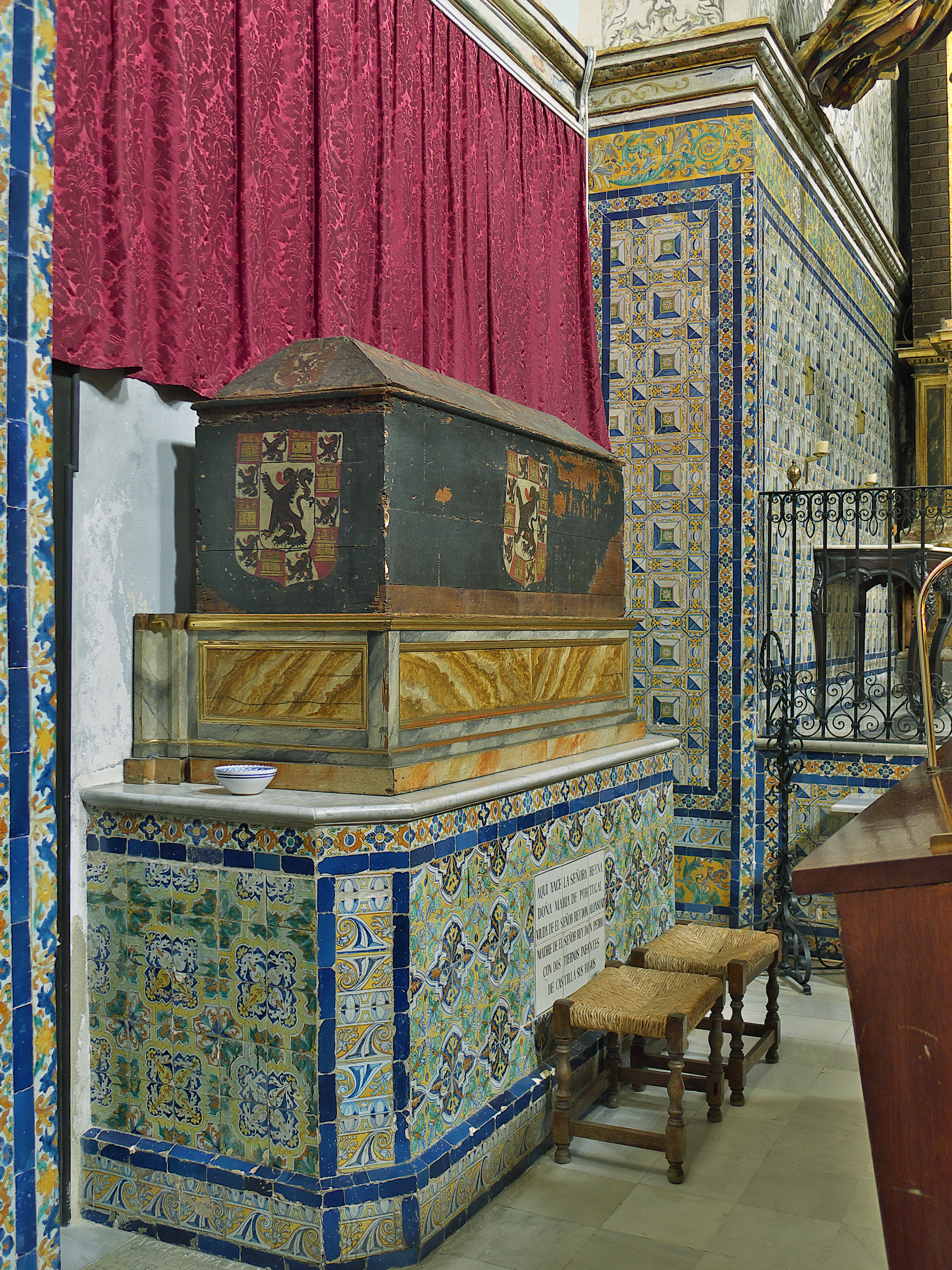
The tomb of Maria of Portugal at the Royal Monastery of San Clemente in Seville.

Maria had executed a will in Valladolid on 8 November 1351 in which she asked to be buried at the Royal Chapel of the Cathedral of Seville where her husband Alfonso XI had been buried and that, if his remains were transferred to another church, hers should also be transferred and buried alongside her husband.

She died in Évora on 18 January 1357 and was buried there until, against the wishes expressed in her will, her remains were transferred to the Royal Monastery of San Clemente in Seville. In 1371, King Henry II had ordered that his father, King Alfonso XI, should receive burial at the Royal Collegiate Church of Saint Hippolytus in Córdoba and at the same time, he probably decided that Maria, who had been responsible for his mother's death, should be buried at the Royal Monastery of San Clemente in Seville. The gravestone made of simple tiles at the monastery mentions that she is buried there with two "tender infants". (Note: Until recently, it was believed that she and King Alfonso had been the parents of the firstborn, Fernando, who died as an infant a few months after his birth. The reference to another infant in the tombstone is also mentioned in some parchments discovered in 1813 when the remains buried at the church of the Monastery were exhumed. These parchments mention that two infants had been buried with their mother, Queen Maria.)

== Children ==
Coat of arms of Maria of Portugal as Queen Consort of Castile
- Two sons buried with their mother in the Royal Monastery of San Clemente in Seville. One of them, the firstborn Fernando, died a few months after birth.
- Peter of Castile (1334–1369), King of Castile and León at the death of his father in 1350. He married Maria de Padilla, Blanche of Bourbon and Juana de Castro. His remains lie today in the crypt of the royal chapel of the Cathedral of Seville.

== Bibliography ==
- Borrero Fernández, Mercedes (1991). El Real Monasterio de San Clemente: Un monasterio cisterciense en la Sevilla Medieval. Sevilla: Comisaría de la Ciudad de Sevilla para 1992, Ayuntamiento de Sevilla. ISBN 84-7952-013-2.
- Díaz Martín, Luis Vicente (2007). Pedro I el Cruel, 1350–1369 (2nd ed.). Gijón: Ediciones Trea S.L. ISBN 978-8497042741.
- López de Ayala, Pedro (1780). Crónica de los Reyes de Castilla, Don Pedro, Don Enrique II, Don Juan I, Don Enrique III. Madrid: Imprenta de D. Antonio de Sancha. OCLC 2921347.
- Dutra, Francis A. (2013). "Afonso IV, King of Portugal". In Gerli, E. Michael (ed.). Medieval Iberia: An Encyclopedia. Routledge.
- Estow, Clara (1995). Pedro the Cruel of Castile (1350-1369). 1995.
- Guillén, Fernando Arias (2020). The Triumph of an Accursed Lineage: Kingship in Castile from Alfonso X to Alfonso XI (1252-1350). Routledge.
- Previte-Orton, C.W. (1960). The Shorter Cambridge Medieval History. Vol. II: The Twelfth Century to the Renaissance. Cambridge at the University Press.
- Valdeón Baruque, Julio (2002). Pedro I el Cruel y Enrique de Trastámara. Santillana Ediciones Generales, S.L.

Royal titles
Vacant Title last held by Constance of Peñafiel	Queen consort of Castile and León; 1328–1350	Vacant Title next held by Blanche of Bourbon
