= Seven Sacraments Altarpiece =

Triptych by Rogier van der Weyden

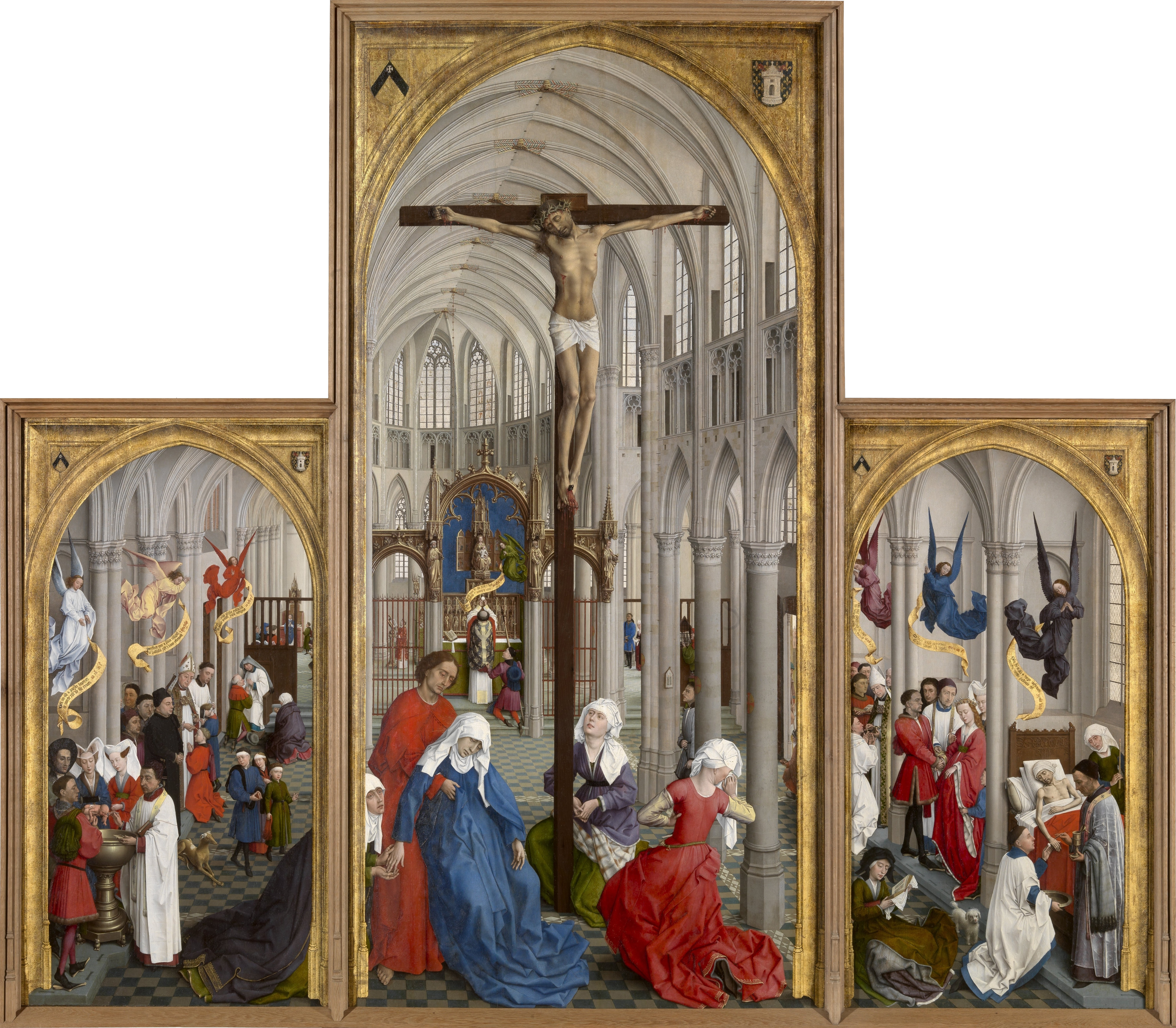
- Artist: Rogier van der Weyden
- Year: 1445-1450
- Medium: oil on panel
- Dimensions: 200 cm × 223 cm (79 in × 88 in)
- Location: Royal Museum of Fine Arts, Antwerp

The Seven Sacraments Altarpiece is a fixed-wing triptych by the Early Netherlandish artist Rogier van der Weyden and his workshop. It was painted from 1445 to 1450, probably for a church in Poligny (Max J. Friedländer claimed that it was commissioned by the Bishop Jean Chevrot), and is now in the Royal Museum of Fine Arts, Antwerp. It depicts the seven sacraments of the Roman Catholic Church. On the left panel are baptism, confirmation and confession and on the right hand panel the ordination of a priest, marriage and the last rites.

== Subject matter ==
The scene takes place in the interior of a Gothic church looking towards the high altar. There is a groin vault ceiling that goes down the nave. There are colonettes with piers that separate the nave from the side aisle. The arcade also features pointed arches, a triforium, and a clearstory which are all elements of gothic architecture.

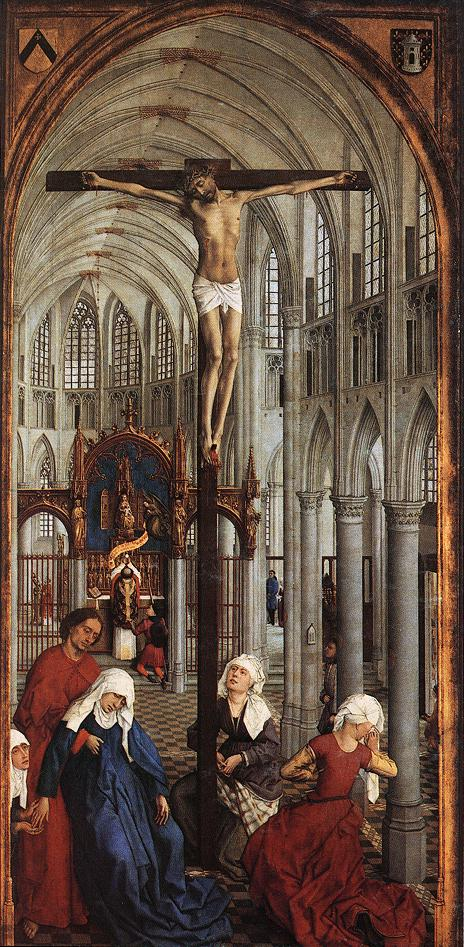
Christ on the Cross and Eucharist

This altarpiece features three distinct panels that all work together to tell about the seven sacraments of the Roman Catholic Church: Baptism, Holy Communion, Confession, Matrimony, Extreme Unction, Holy Orders, and Confirmation. The central panel (possibly the only autograph part of the work) is dominated by a crucifixion in the foreground, with the sacrament of the Eucharist in the background. The middle panel is all about the Eucharist titled Christ on the Cross and Eucharist. At the back of the middle panel, a priest is seen elevating the Host while at the altar.

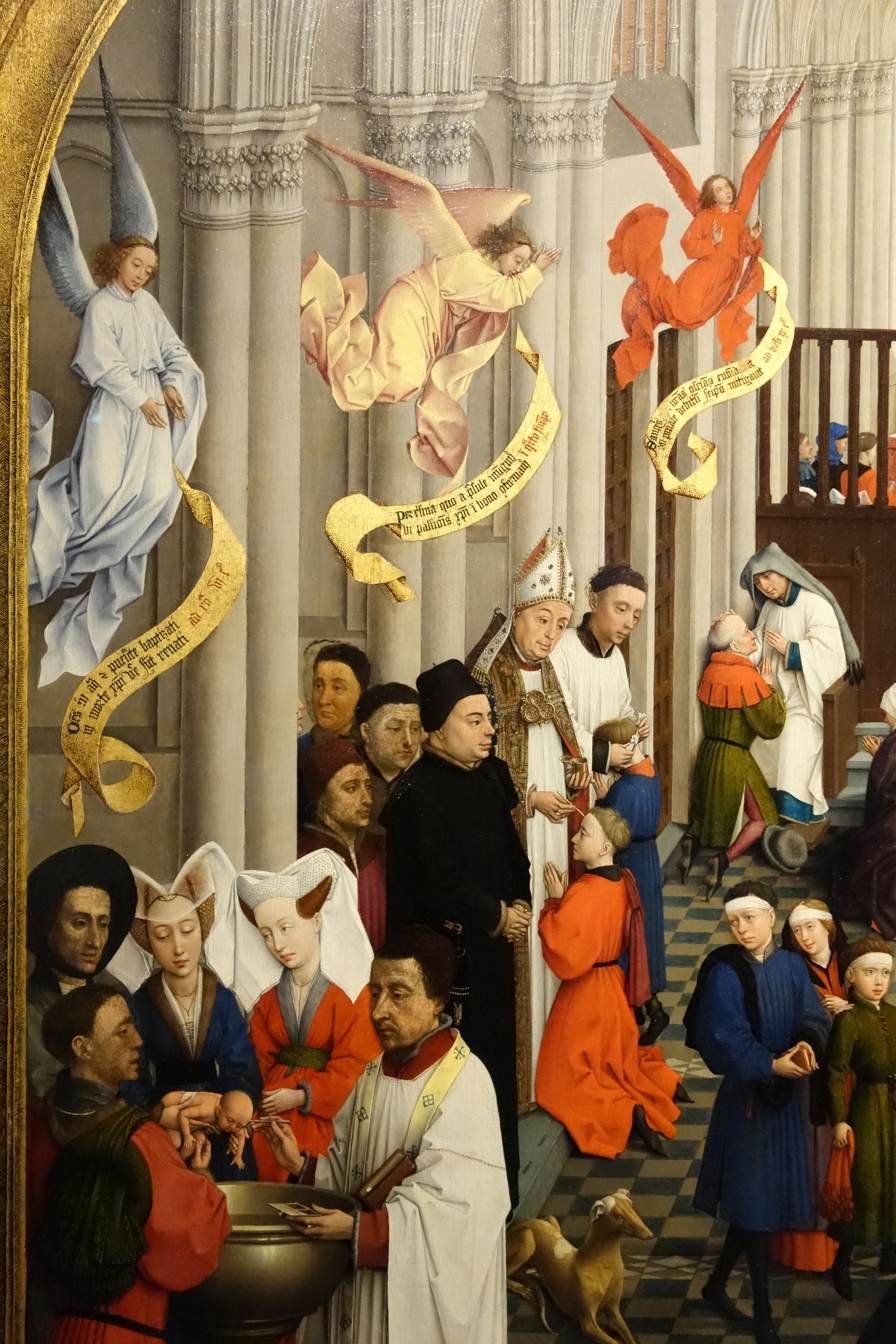
Baptism, Confirmation, and Confession

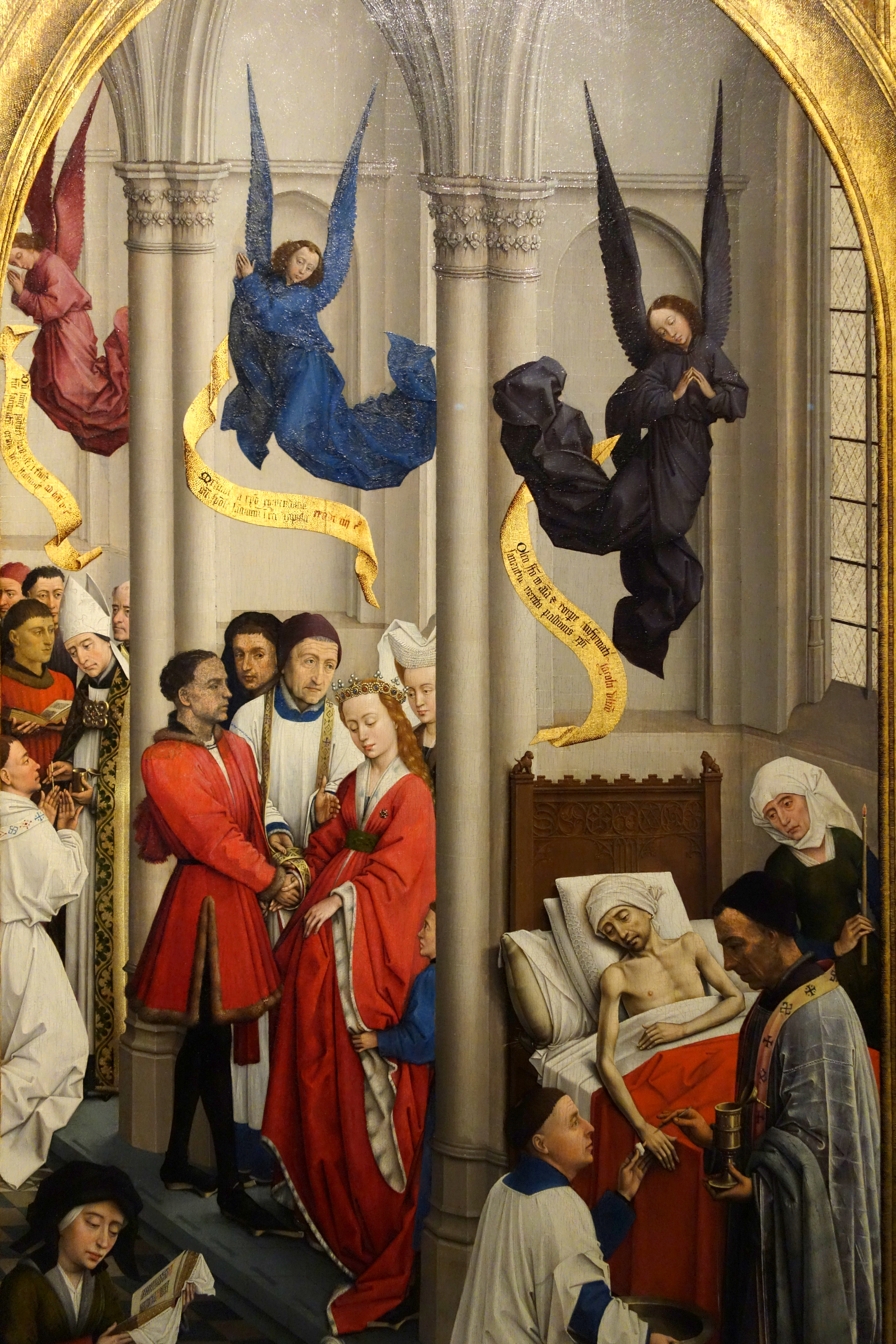
The Ordinatio, Marriage, and Extreme Unction

The left side panel is called Baptism, Confirmation, and Confession. Baptism is shown in the lower left corner with the priest helping perform the baptism to the small baby being held by the man. Confirmation is in the middle of the left panel with a child on this knees in a praying position in front of a bishop, ready to be anointed by the Oil of Chrism. Confession is shown on the right side of the left panel with 2 people on their knees praying to a priest. The side panels also depict the altarpiece's commissioners, along with some portrait heads only added shortly before the work was completed. Two coats of arms (probably that of the commissioners) (left: "sable" chevron on "or" field; right: "argent" tower on "sable" field) are painted in the spandrels of the painting's inner frame. The right panel is called The Ordinatio, Marriage, and Extreme Unction. The right panel on the left side shows a priest being ordained by the two men shown. In the middle of the panel is marriage depicted by a priest joining the hands of a man and a woman. The bottom right panel shows a sickly man in bed with people around him trying to heal him. This is a representation of anointing.

Angels hover over each sacrament with scrolls, with clothes colour-matched to the sacraments, from white for baptism to black for the last rites. Each sacrament action has a Latin phrase above it as well. The writing on the Baptism, Confirmation, and Confession panel from left to right is "Oes in aqu pneuate baptizati/ in morte chri ve sut renati/ ad roa vi co". The writing on the Christ on the Cross and Eucharist panel on the altarpiece is "Hic pais manu sti sps forat i vigie/ Igne passiois e decoct in cruce/ Abro i li sacmet". The writing on The Ordinatio, Marriage, and Extreme Unction panel from right to left is "Du sum potifex lesus i sta itavt/ tuc sacmentu ordis vere stauravit/ ad heb ix co". This writing above the sacraments is written on a banderole. These Latin phrases are of ecclesiastical writings.

=== Figures and patronage ===
There has been no documentation of the commission record, but scholars believe the altarpiece to be commissioned by Jean Chevrot. Chevrot was a French bishop to the city of Doornik, also called Tournai. Chevrot can be seen as the bishop in the confirmation ceremony. The framework of the painting suggests that other people in the image could also be based on real historical figures. This can be attested to by how some of the faces of the people were painted on a pewter sheet that was later attached to the wooden panel.

In the top of the arch in each panel, two symbols can be found. The symbol on the left is represented as the coat of legs of the Chevrot family. The second coat of arms on the right side of the arches has been interpreted as two different symbols. The first explanation is that it is the coat of arms for Doornik. This would align with the idea that this altarpiece was designed to be put in Chevrot's private chapel in Doornik. The second explanation is that the coat of arms is for the Couraults of Poligny. This would mean that the altarpiece was meant for the Saint Anthony chapel in the church of Saint Hippolytus. This church was founded in Poligny in 1445 by Chevrot and where he was born.

== History ==
=== Collaboration ===
Van der Weyden had his own workshop and many assistants to help with this altarpiece. This altarpiece was a collaborative work between van der Weyden and his assistants. Through a restoration project on the piece beginning in 2006, a yellowed layer of varnish was removed from the painting. This layer was then restored to its original state, the restorers came to the conclusion that van der Weyden had painted the entire center panel. They also noticed that he left some aspects of the architecture and figures on either side panel to be painted by assistants.

=== Provenance ===
In 1681, this altarpiece was owned by Jean Perrault who was in Paris. In 1826, it was acquired by the Chevalier Florent van Ertborn from the heirs of Perad, the last Premier President of the Parlement of Burgundy in Dijon. In 1841 the art collection of van Ertborn was then bequeathed to the Royal Museum of Fine Arts, Antwerp where it is still at today.

=== Restoration ===
The altarpiece did go through a restoration process between 2006-2009 which was sponsored by the foundation Fonds Baillet Latour and SD Worx. The project was headed by Dr. Griet Steyaert The restoration of this painting was deeply needed as the paint layer had become loose which caused some of the paint to flake off. There was also a large layer of yellowish varnish on the painting making it difficult to see details and the overall richness of the painting. Once problem posed during this restoration process was how to fix the heads of some of the figures. This issue arose from how van der Weyden had originally painted some faces on a pewter sheet that was later attached to the wooden panel. The painting was also fitted with a new frame that highly resembled its original frame.

== See also ==
- List of works by Rogier van der Weyden

== Bibliography ==
- Felix Thürlemann: Rogier van der Weyden: Leben und Werk, C.H. Beck Wissen 2006, ISBN 3-406-53592-5. (in German)
- Flügelaltäre : Caterina Limentani Virdis, Mari Pietrogiovanna, München, Hirmer, 2002, ISBN 3-7774-9520-4. (in German)
