= Henry II of Castile =

King of Castile and León (1366–1367, 1369–1379)

Henry II
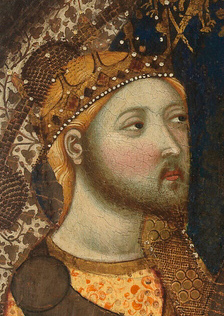
- Depiction of Henry by Jaume Serra (c. 1375)

King of Castile and León
- Reign: 13 March 1366 – 3 April 1367
- Coronation: 29 March 1366, Santa María la Real de Las Huelgas
- Predecessor: Peter
- Successor: Peter
- Reign: 23 March 1369 – 29 May 1379
- Predecessor: Peter
- Successor: John I
- Born: 13 January 1334; Seville
- Died: 29 May 1379 (aged 45); Santo Domingo de la Calzada
- Burial: Cathedral of Toledo
- Spouse: Juana Manuel (m. 1350)
- Issue among others...: John I, King of Castile; Eleanor, Queen of Navarre; Infanta Joanna
- House: Ivrea (by birth); Trastámara (founder)
- Father: Alfonso XI of Castile
- Mother: Eleanor de Guzmán

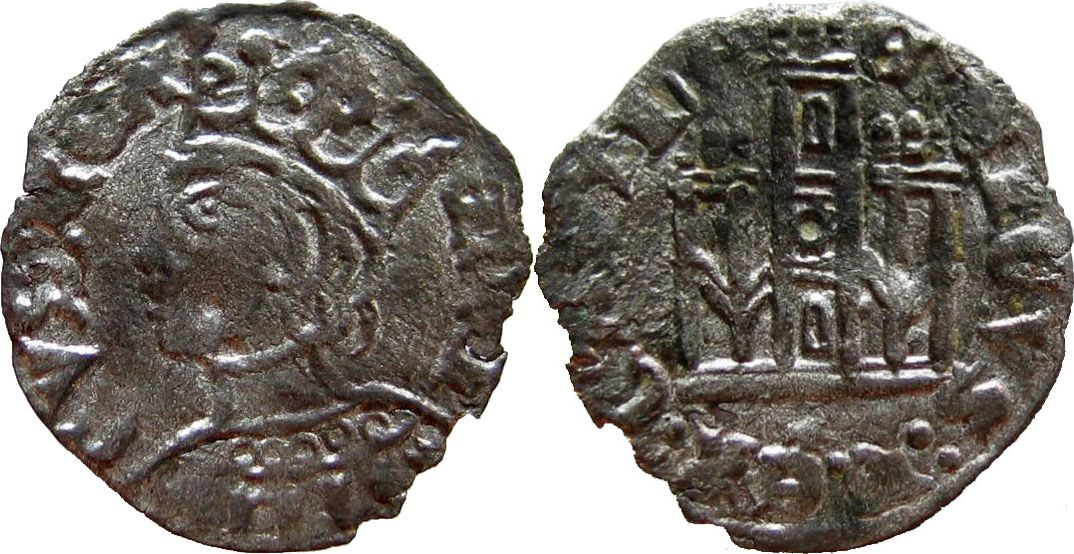
Coins minted by Henry II.

Henry II (13 January 1334 – 29 May 1379), called Henry of Trastámara or the Fratricidal (el Fratricida), was the first King of Castile and León from the House of Trastámara. He became king in 1369 by defeating his half-brother King Peter the Cruel, after numerous rebellions and battles. As king, he was involved in the Fernandine Wars and the Hundred Years' War.

== Biography ==
Henry was the fourth of ten illegitimate children of King Alfonso XI of Castile and Eleanor de Guzmán, a great-granddaughter of King Alfonso IX of León. He was born a twin to Fadrique Alfonso, Lord of Haro, and was the first boy born to the couple that survived to adulthood.

At birth, he was adopted by Rodrigo Álvarez de las Asturias. Rodrigo died the following year and Henry inherited his lordship of Noreña. His father later made him Count of Trastámara and lord of Lemos and Sarria in Galicia, and the towns of Cabrera and Ribera, which constituted a large and important heritage in the northwest of the peninsula. It made him the head of the new Trastámara dynasty, arising from the main branch of Burgundy-Ivrea.

While Alfonso XI lived, his lover Eleanor gave a great many titles and privileges to their sons. This caused discontent among many of the noblemen and in particular the queen, Maria of Portugal, and her son, Peter.

They had a chance for revenge when Alfonso XI died unexpectedly from a fever in the siege of Gibraltar in March, 1350. They pushed Eleanor, her sons and their supporters aside, and Henry and his brothers fled and were scattered. They were fearful of what their brother, King Peter, could do to them. The late king had not even been buried.

Although Eleanor and her sons reached an agreement with Peter to live peacefully in his court, the situation remained unstable. Henry and his brothers Fadrique, Tello and Sancho staged numerous rebellions against the new king. Also, to strengthen his position and gain allies, Henry married Juana Manuel, the daughter of Juan Manuel, Prince of Villena, adelantado mayor of Murcia and Lord of Villena, the most prosperous nobleman of the realm. In 1351, the King took counsel from Juan Alfonso de Alburquerque, María of Portugal's right-hand man. He became convinced that his father's lover was the instigator of the uprisings, so he ordered Eleanor to be incarcerated and finally executed in Talavera de la Reina.

After that, Henry fled to Portugal. He was pardoned by Peter and returned to Castile, then revolted in Asturias in 1352. He reconciled with his brother, only to rebel against him again in a long, intermittent war, which ended with Henry's flight to France, where he entered the service of King John II of France.

Shortly after, Henry and his men spent time in King Peter IV of Aragon's army in their war against Castile (1358). During that conflict, he was defeated and held prisoner in Nájera (1360). He was liberated (with the help of Juan Ramírez de Arellano, among others) and exiled himself to France once more.

Then Peter IV of Aragon attacked Castile again. Henry agreed to help him on condition that he would lend his support to destroying his half-brother. This became the Castilian Civil War. The attack combined Henry's Castilian allies, the Aragonese and the French (a company of Bertrand du Guesclin's mercenaries), they invaded Castile and expelled Peter, who had taken refuge in Guyenne, France). Henry was proclaimed king in the Abbey of Santa María la Real de Las Huelgas, Burgos (1366). In return, he had to reward his allies with titles and riches for the help they had provided. This earned him the nickname el de las mercedes ("mercedes" being Spanish for "mercies").

Peter I of Castile fled north to Bordeaux, the capital of the English dominions in France, where Edward, the Black Prince held court. Edward agreed to help Peter recover his throne. Despite the fact that the army suffered so badly from dysentery that it is said that one out of every five Englishmen did not return home, on 3 April 1367 an Anglo-Gascon army, led by Edward and his younger brother, John of Gaunt, 1st Duke of Lancaster, met the Castilian forces (supported by French mercenaries under Bertrand du Guesclin). Peter then defeated Henry in the Battle of Nájera and returned to the throne of Castille, but Henry escaped and returned to France under the protection of King Charles V of France. King Peter and Prince Edward parted ways over the funding of the expedition, and the Black Prince returned to Bordeaux, having contracted an illness on this expedition that would ail him until his death in 1376.

They reorganised their army at Peyrepertuse Castle. Then, with the help of many Castilian rebels and Bertrand du Guesclin's Frenchmen, they defeated Peter at the Battle of Montiel on 14 March 1369. Henry killed "the Cruel King", now a prisoner, with his own hand. This definitively won him the Castilian throne and the name of Henry II.

Before being consolidated in his throne and being able to hand on power to his son John, Henry had to defeat King Ferdinand I of Portugal. He embarked on two out of three Fernandine Wars (1369-71 and 1372-73). Ferdinand's main ally in these wars was the English prince John of Gaunt, the husband of Peter's eldest daughter Constance of Castile. Henry was allied with King Charles V of France. He put the Castilian navy at Charles' disposal and they played a key part in the siege of La Rochelle, and the Battle of La Rochelle where the Admiral of Castile Ambrosio Boccanegra completely defeated the English fleets from reinforcing in Aquitane.

Henry recompensed his allies, but he still had to defend his interests in the Kingdom of Castile and León. Consequently, he denied the King of Aragon the territories that he had promised him in the difficult times before his accession.

Henry then went to war against Portugal and England in the Hundred Years' War. For most of his reign he had to fight off the attempts of John of Gaunt, the son of Edward III of England, to claim the Castilian throne in right of Constance. In his domestic policy he started to rebuild the kingdom, sped up the transformation of the royal administration; and held numerous courts. He also permanently set up the Lordship of Biscay after the death of his brother Tello Alfonso. In foreign policy, he favoured France over England.

He died on 29 May 1379 in Santo Domingo de la Calzada. His son John I of Castile succeeded him on the throne.

== Policy regarding Jews ==
Henry was as hostile to the Jews as Peter had been friendly. In order to pay Bertrand du Guesclin's mercenaries, he imposed a war contribution of twenty thousand gold doubloons on the already heavily oppressed community of Toledo. He issued an order to take all the Jews of Toledo as prisoners, to give them neither food nor drink and if they still refused to raise this enormous sum, to sell their property, both movable and immovable, at auction. Nonetheless, he was compelled, owing to his financial straits, to have recourse to Jewish financiers. He made Don Joseph Pichon his chief tax collector (contador major) and appointed several Jews "farmers of the taxes".

The demands of the Cortes in Toro (1369) and Burgos (1374 and 1377) against the Jews harmonized perfectly with Henry's inclinations. He ordered the Jews to wear the humiliating badge and forbade them to use Christian names. He further ordered that Christian debtors repay only two-thirds of the principal for short loans. Shortly before his death, Henry declared that Jews should no longer be permitted to hold public office.

Henry was potentially the first ruler since the Visigothic King Ergica to implement anti-Jewish policies in the Iberian Peninsula.

== Burial ==
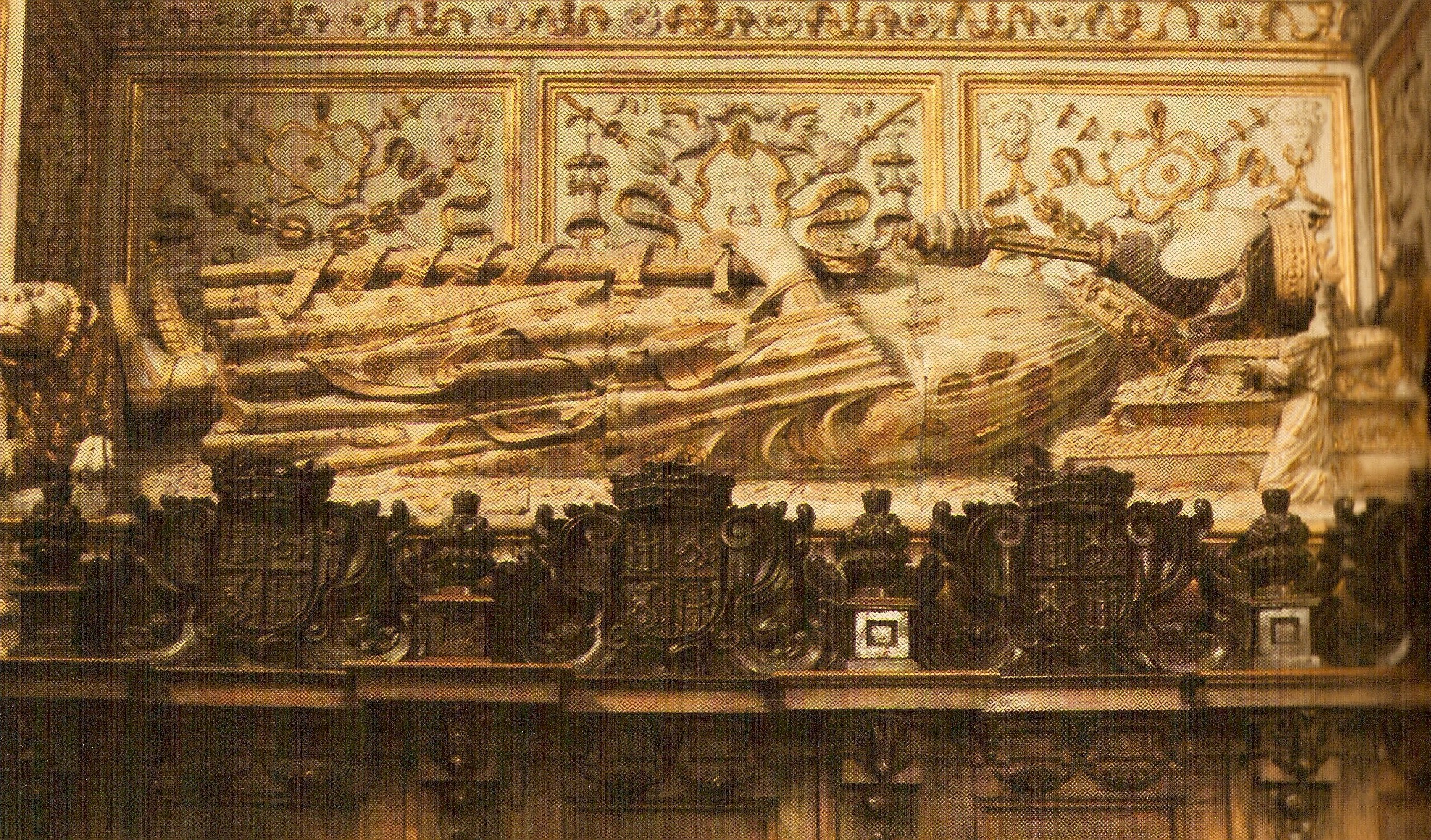
The tomb of Henry II of Castile.

After Henry's death, his body was transported to Burgos, then to Valladolid, then finally to Toledo where he was buried in Capilla de los Reyes Nuevos de Toledo His remains are still there today. His grave is in the choir stalls at one side of the church and it is in the Plateresque style. The box is adorned with the shields of Castille and León, and the lower interior part has three panels decorated with trophies. There are two cherubs over the panels, holding the cartouche on which the king's epitaph is displayed. The inscription translates to:

Here lies the most adventurous and noble knight and king, the sweetly remembered Don Henry, son of the late noble king Don Alfonso, who came from Benmarin and ended his life in Santo Domingo de la Calzada, he just died gloriously on the XXX day of May, in the year of our saviour Jesus Christ MCCCLXXIX.

There is a recumbent statue of Henry II on top of the tomb. It is made from polychromed alabaster. It depicts the king wearing his royal robes, with his sword in his left hand and his girdle decorated with the lions of Castile. His right hand holds the sceptre, the upper end of which rests on three pillows that support the monarch's head. The king wears slippers and his feet rest on a recumbent lion.

The king's entrails are buried in the Cathedral of Santo Domingo de la Calzada.

== Partners and children ==
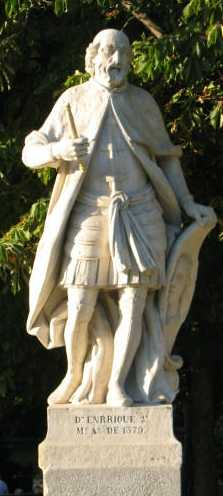
Statue of Henry II at the Royal Palace of Madrid.

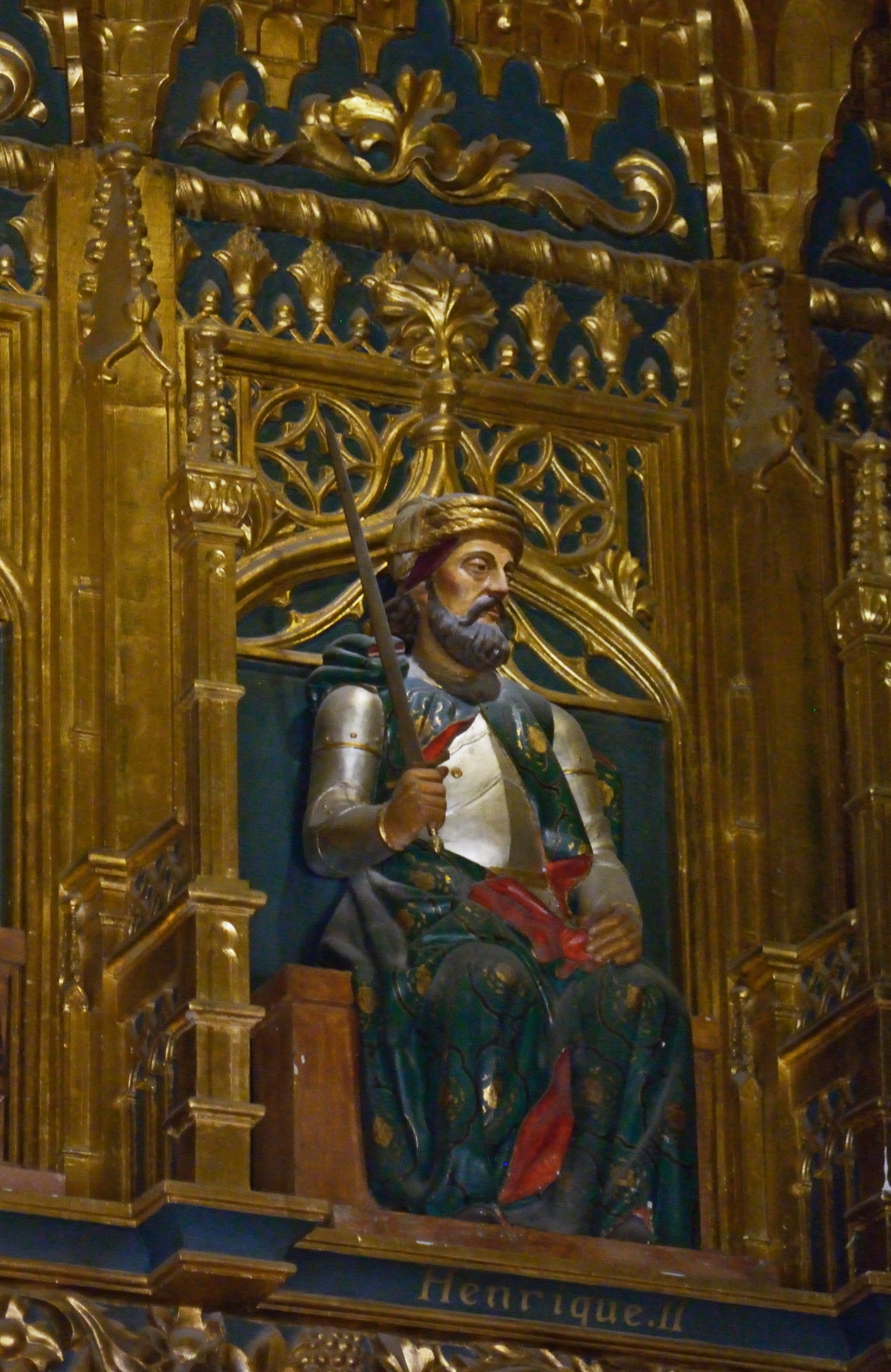
Image of Henry II of Castile on the Royal Hall frieze in the Alcázar of Segovia

On 27 July 1350, Henry married Juana Manuel, the daughter of Juan Manuel, Prince of Villena, head of a younger branch of the royal house of Castile. They had three children:

- John I (1358–1390).
- Eleanor (1361–1425), wife of King Charles III of Navarre.
- Joanna (1372–1376), died young.

He had several children outside wedlock, some of which he mentioned in his will dated 29 May 1374:

- Alfonso Enríquez, Count of Gijón and Noreña (1355 – c. 1400), a son of Elvira Íñiguez, (Note: Although she is called Inés Díaz de la Vega in some genealogies, King Henry II mentions her several times in his will as Elvira Íñiguez. This could be an error transmitted from one genealogy to another or perhaps it refers to another mistress and mother of one or more of his illegitimate issue.) Count of Noreña and Gijón. He married Isabel of Portugal, Lady of Viseu.
- Leonor de Castilla, daughter of Leonor Álvarez, from Dueñas, Palencia.
- Juana de Castilla (1367–?), daughter of Elvira Íñiguez. Her father mentioned her in his will, and said that if she did not marry Pedro de Aragon then she would inherit Urueña. Pedro was the Marquis of Villena (1362—Aljubarrota, 1385) and son of Alfonso of Aragon and Foix. (Note: Her son from this marriage, celebrated in 1378, was Enrique de Villena, master of the Orden de Calatrava, Count of Cangas and Tineo, and husband of María de Albornoz, Lady of the Infantado.)
- Constanza Enríquez de Castilla. Her father did not mention her mother's name. When he wrote the will in 1374, she was engaged to Infante Denis, Lord of Cifuentes (1354–1397). However, she eventually married his brother, Infante John, Duke of Valencia de Campos (1349–1387). She inherited Alba de Tormes.
- Fernando Enríquez de Castilla (1365–1438). His father describes him as the son of Beatriz Fernández.
- María de Castilla (1375– c. 1393), daughter of Beatriz Fernández. She married Diego Hurtado de Mendoza (Admiral of Castile), Lord of Mendoza, and Mayordomo mayor of King John II of Castile.
- Fadrique de Castilla (1360–1394), son of Beatriz Ponce de León y Jérica. Named Duke of Benavente by his father, he died in prison in Almodóvar del Río in 1394. He married Leonor Sánchez de Castilla, illegitimate daughter of Sancho Alfonso, 1st Count of Alburquerque.
- Beatriz de Castilla (?–1409), daughter of Beatriz Ponce de León y Jérica and Lady of Niebla. She married Juan Alonso de Guzmán in 1370 or 1371. He was Lord of Sanlúcar de Barrameda and the first Count of Niebla. Later she became a nun in the San Clement Monastery in Seville, where she was buried. (Note: She is not mentioned in her father's will.)
- Enrique de Castilla (1378–1404), son of the Cordoban Lady Juana de Sousa, daughter of Vasco Alfonso de Sousa, the mayor of Córdoba, with María Gómez Carrillo, the Duchess of Medina Sidonia and Countess of Cabra. Enrique is buried in the Cathedral of Córdoba. (Note: He is not mentioned in his father's 1374 will.)
- Pedro Enríquez de Castilla (?–1366). He is buried in Segovia Cathedral.
- Isabel Enríquez de Castilla (?– c. 1419), daughter of Juana de Cárcamo. She married Gonzalo Núñez de Guzmán, however, this marriage was dissolved by Antipope Clement VII. Later she entered the monastery of Santa Clara la Real de Toledo where she became its abbess and was buried.
- Inés Enríquez de Castilla (?– c. 1443), daughter of Juana de Cárcamo, also an abbess of the monastery at Santa Clara la Real de Toledo where she was buried. (Note: Both sisters feature in the monastery's documents, receiving various favours from their uncle the king Henry III of Castile.)
- Juana Enríquez de Castilla, daughter de Juana, Lady of Cifuentes and wife of Infante Denis, Lord of Cifuentes (1354–1397), son of Peter I of Portugal and Inês de Castro, she is buried at Santa María de Guadalupe.

== Ancestors ==
Ancestors of Henry II of Castile

16. Alfonso X of Castile
8. Sancho IV of Castile
17. Violant of Aragon
4. Ferdinand IV of Castile
18. Alfonso of Molina
9. María de Molina
19. Mayor Alfonso de Meneses
2. Alfonso XI of Castile
20. Afonso III of Portugal
10. Denis, King of Portugal
21. Beatrice of Castile
5. Constance of Portugal
22. Peter III of Aragon
11. Elizabeth of Aragon
23. Constance of Sicily
Henry II of Castile
24. Pedro Núñez de Guzmán
12. Álvar Pérez de Guzmán
25. Teresa Rodríguez Brizuela
6. Pedro Núñez de Guzmán
26. Gonzalo Ruiz Girón
13. María González Girón
27. Elvira Díaz de Castañeda
3. Leonor de Guzmán
28. Pedro Ponce de Cabrera
14. Fernán Pérez Ponce de León
29. Aldonza Alfonso de León
7. Juana Ponce de León
30. Gutierre Suárez de Meneses
15. Urraca Gutiérrez de Meneses
31. Elvira Anes de Sousa

== Titles ==
By the end of his reign, he bore the titles of the King of Castile, Toledo, León, Galicia, Sevilla, Córdoba, Murcia, Jaén, the Algarve and Lord of Molina.

== Bibliography ==
- Arco y Garay, Ricardo del (1954). Instituto Jerónimo Zurita. Consejo Superior de Investigaciones Científicas. (ed.). Sepulcros de la Casa Real de Castilla [Tombs of the Castilian Royal Family] (in Spanish) (1st ed.). Madrid. OCLC 11366237.
- Bartlett, Robert (2020). Blood Royal: Dynastic Politics in Medieval Europe. Cambridge University Press.
- Borrás Gualis, Gonzalo M. (2014). "La Virgen de Tobed. Exvoto dinástico de los Trastámara" (PDF). In Escribano Paño, María Victoria; Duplá Ansuátegui, Antonio; Sancho Rocher, Laura; Villacampa Rubio, María Angustias (eds.). Miscelánea de estudios en homenaje a Guillermo Fatás Cabeza. Zaragoza: Institución Fernando el Católico. pp. 167–176. ISBN 978-84-9911-302-9.
- Elorza, Juan C.; Vaquero, Lourdes; Castillo, Belén; Negro, Marta (1990). Junta de Castilla y León. Consejería de Cultura y Bienestar Social (ed.). El Panteón Real de las Huelgas de Burgos. Los enterramientos de los reyes de León y de Castilla [The Royal Pantheon of the Huelgas de Burgos. The graves of the monarchs of León and Castile] (in Spanish) (2nd ed.). Editorial Evergráficas S.A. ISBN 84-241-9999-5.
- López de Ayala, Pedro (1994–1997). Buenos Aires (ed.). Crónica del rey don Pedro y del rey don Enrique, su hermano, hijos del rey don Alfonso Onceno [A chronicle of the kings Peter and Henry, his brother, sons of the king Alfonso Onceno] (in Spanish). OCLC 489686613. (critical edition and notes by Germán Orduna; a preliminary study by Germán Orduna and José Luis Moure)
- Sumption, Jonathan (1999). The Hundred Years War Volume II: Trial by Fire. Philadelphia: University of Pennsylvania. ISBN 978-0-8122-3527-2.
- Valdeón Baruque, Julio (1996). Palencia. Diputación Provincial de Palencia (ed.). Enrique II. Diputación Provincial de Palencia. ISBN 84-8173-051-3.
- Todesca, James, ed. (2015). The Emergence of León-Castile c.1065-1500: Essays Presented to J.F. O'Callaghan. Ashgate Publishing Limited.

Henry II of Castile House of Trastámara Cadet branch of the House of Ivrea Born: 13 January 1334 Died: 29 May 1379
Regnal titles
Preceded by Peter	King of Castile and León; 1366–1367	Succeeded by Peter
Preceded by Peter	King of Castile and León; 1369–1379	Succeeded by John I
