= Eleanor de Guzmán =

Castilian noblewoman and long-term mistress to Alfonso XI of Castile

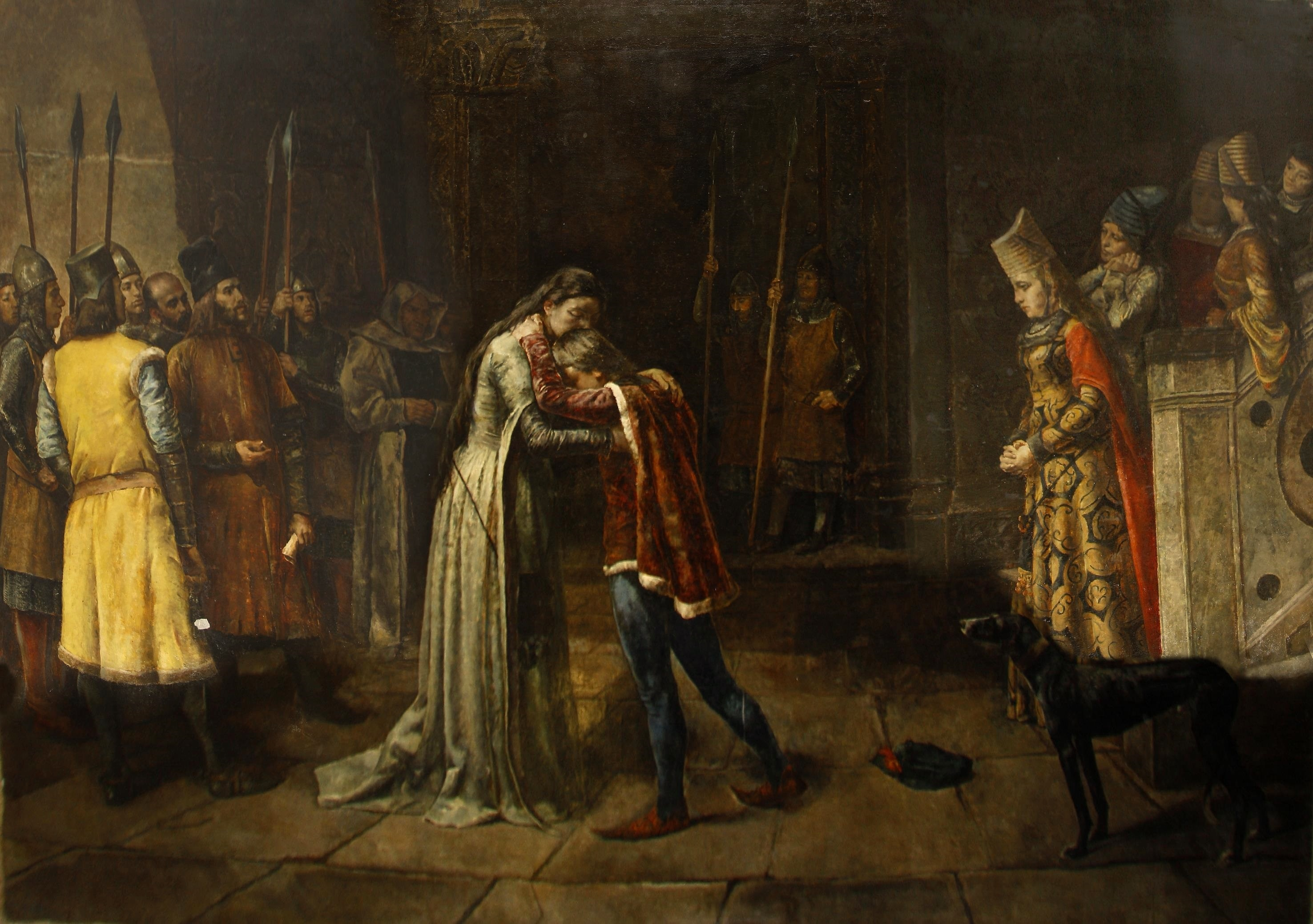
- Guzmán bidding farewell to her son Fadrique Alfonso before her execution
- Born: 1310; Seville
- Died: 1351 (aged 40–41); Talavera de la Reina
- Buried: Collegiate church of Santa María, Talavera de la Reina
- Spouse: Juan de Velasco
- Issue among others...: Henry II of Castile; Fadrique Alfonso, Lord of Haro; Tello Alfonso, Lord of Aguilar de Campoo; Sancho Alfonso, 1st Count of Alburquerque
- Father: Pedro Núñez de Guzmán
- Mother: Beatriz Ponce de León

Leonor (Eleanor) de Guzmán y Ponce de León (1310–1351) was a Castilian noblewoman. After about 1330, she became the long-term mistress and favourite of Alfonso XI, with whom she had the illegitimate son Henry "the Fratricidal", future first monarch of the House of Trastámara. She held the lordship of Medina-Sidonia until she fell from grace in the wake of Alfonso's death in 1350. She was then executed by her enemies.

== Life ==
Eleanor was the daughter of nobleman Pedro Núñez de Guzmán and his wife, Beatriz Ponce de León, a great-granddaughter of King Alfonso IX of León. Her parents married her off as a young girl to Juan de Velasco.

Eleanor's husband died in 1328, at twenty years old. Soon thereafter, in Seville she met King Alfonso XI. He was so impressed by her beauty that he made her his mistress. He preferred Eleanor to his wife Maria of Portugal, daughter of Alfonso IV of Portugal, whom he married in 1328. After Maria's son and heir, the future Peter of Castile, was born in 1334, Alfonso left Maria and lived with De Guzmán instead. The humiliated queen resented her unfaithful husband and asked him to cease his public displays of preference for his mistress. The king ignored his wife's pleas, and gave Eleanor Huelva, Tordesillas, and Medina-Sidonia in addition to other holdings. He also established Eleanor's household in Seville where she was allowed to hear political matters. The court was increasingly troubled by Alfonso's behavior and as a result, the Pope intervened by forcing Portugal to invade Castile.

The King died on 27 March 1350 and was succeeded by his heir Peter and his wife Maria, who served as regent. Maria had not forgotten the myriad slights that she had endured because of her husband's love for his mistress. Thirsting for revenge, Maria imprisoned Eleanor, and later ordered the execution of her rival in 1351 in the alcázar of Talavera de la Reina. Eleanor's death only exacerbated the rift within the royal family. Her son Henry and Maria's son Peter continued to fight one another for control of Castile. Henry eventually won and was crowned King of Castile.

== Children ==
- Pedro Alfonso, 1st Lord of Aguilar de Campoo (1331/1332–1338)
- Sancho Alfonso, 1st Lord of Ledesma (1332/1333–1342)
- Henry II of Castile (1333/1334–1379)
- Fadrique Alfonso, Henry's twin brother, Master of the Order of Santiago and 1st Lord of Haro (1333/1334–1358)
- Fernando Alfonso, 2nd Lord of Ledesma (1334–c. 1350)
- Tello Alfonso, 2nd Lord of Aguilar de Campoo (1337–1370)
- Juan Alfonso, 1st Lord of Jerez de los Caballeros (1340–1359)
- Juana Alfonso (1342–after 1376), Lady of Trastámara due to her marriage in 1354 to Fernando Ruiz de Castro. The marriage was annulled and in 1366 she married Felipe de Castro.
- Sancho Alfonso, 1st Count of Alburquerque (1342–1374)
- Pedro Alfonso (1345–1359)

Eleanor was a common ancestor to the Catholic Monarchs. Three of her sons, Henry II of Castile, Fadrique Alfonso and Sancho Alfonso, 1st Count of Alburquerque were ancestors of Ferdinand II of Aragon. In addition, Isabella I of Castile, wife of Ferdinand II of Aragon, was descended from both De Guzmán and Maria: Henry II of Castile's grandson, Henry III of Castile, married Peter of Castile's granddaughter, Catherine of Lancaster; their son, John II of Castile, was the father of Isabella I of Castile.

== Ancestors ==
Ancestors of Eleanor de Guzmán

8. Pedro Núñez de Guzmán
4. Álvar Pérez de Guzmán
9. Teresa Rodríguez Brizuela
2. Pedro Núñez de Guzmán
10. Gonzalo Rodríguez Girón
5. María González Girón
11. Elvira Díaz de Castañeda
Leonor de Guzmán
12. Pedro Ponce de Cabrera
6. Fernán Pérez Ponce de León
13. Aldonza Alfonso of León
3. Juana Ponce de León
14. Gutierre Suárez de Meneses
7. Urraca Gutiérrez de Meneses
15. Elvira Anes de Sousa
