= Monastery of San Clemente (Sevilla) =

Monastery in Sevilla, Spain

Coordinates: 37.402542°N 5.995472°W

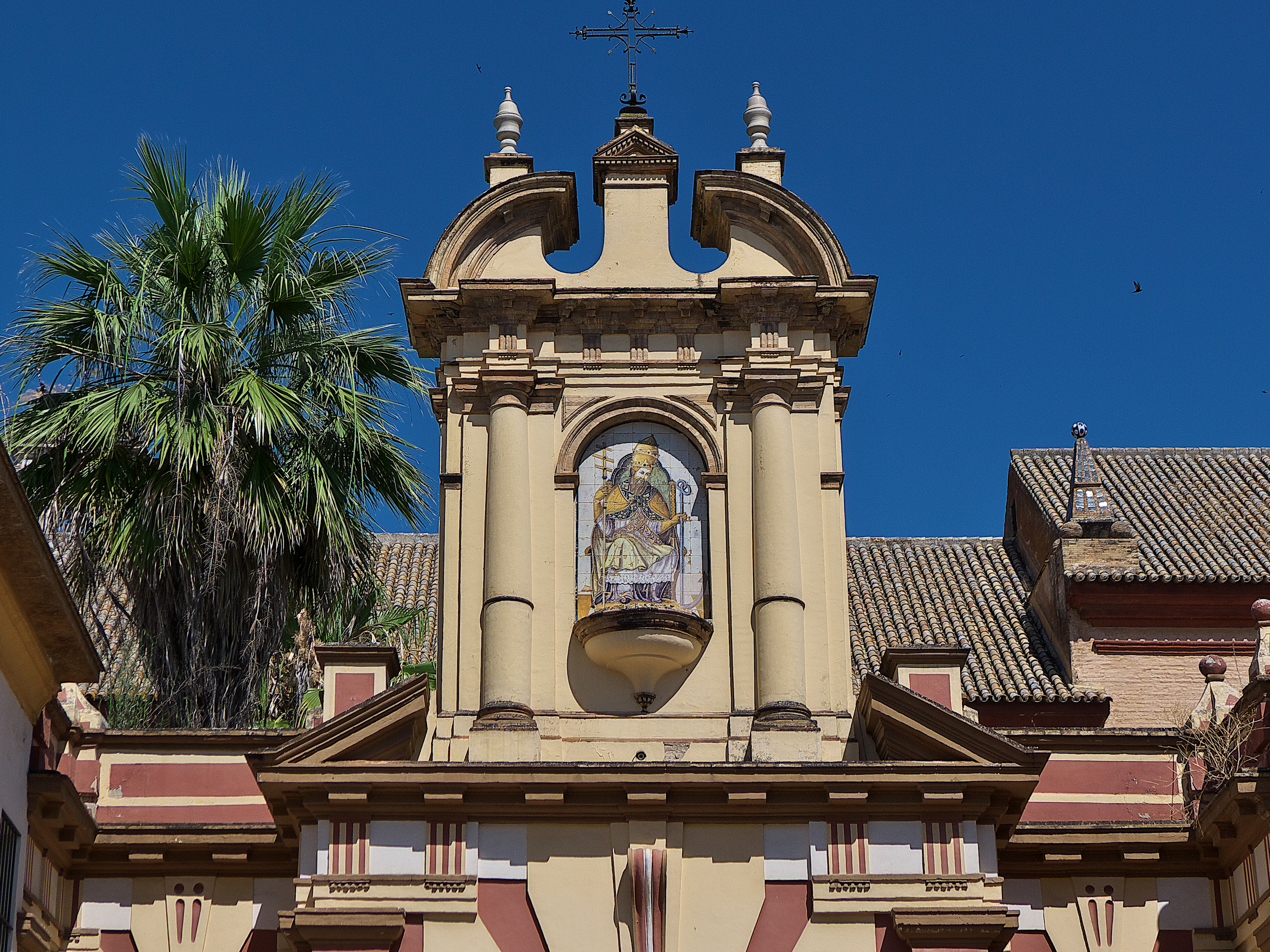
Royal Monastery of San Clemente

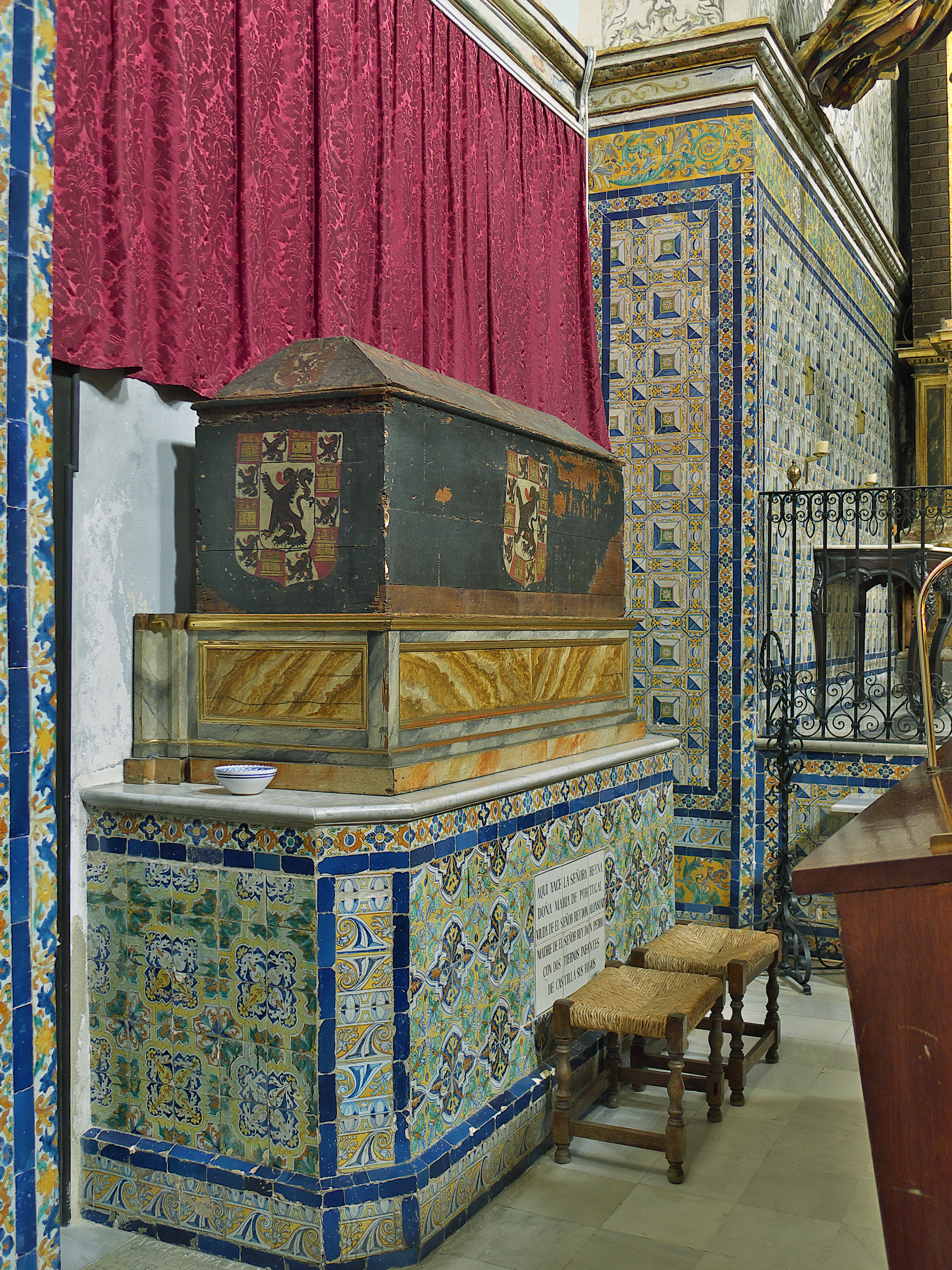
The tomb of Maria of Portugal

Monastery of San Clemente (Real Monasterio de San Clemente) is a Cistercian monastery with the Bien de Interés Cultural designation in the Spanish city of Seville. Architecturally, it is a heterogeneous set of buildings, built in different times and styles, from the 16th to the 17th century. It is the burial place of Maria of Portugal, Queen of Castile.

In 1992 the monastery was the location of an exhibition of historic silver as part of Seville's Expo '92 events.
