= Coronation of the Spanish monarch =

Ceremonies linked to new Spanish monarchs

The proclamation of the Spanish monarch refers to the ceremonies proclaiming the kings of Spain. In Spain, kings are not crowned, but proclaimed.

== History ==
No monarch of Spain has been crowned as such since Isabella I of Castile (1474), Ferdinand II of Aragon (1414), and Catherine of Navarre with her husband John III of Navarre (1494). Joan III of Navarre was crowned as late as 1555, although she ruled Navarre beyond the Pyrenees. Instead, the new monarch appears at the Cortes, where he or she takes a formal oath to uphold the Constitution. Although the crown is displayed at the ceremony, it is never actually placed on the monarch's head. Historical Castilian coronations were performed at Toledo, or the Church of St Jerome in Madrid, with the king being anointed by the archbishop of Toledo. The monarch assumed the royal sword, scepter, crown of gold and the apple of gold, after receiving his anointing. Aragonese coronations were performed at Zaragoza by the Archbishop of Tarragona.

== Alfonso XIII ==
When Alfonso came of age in May 1902, the week of his majority was marked by festivities, bullfights, balls and receptions throughout Spain. He took his oath to the constitution before members of the Cortes on 17 May.

== Juan Carlos I ==
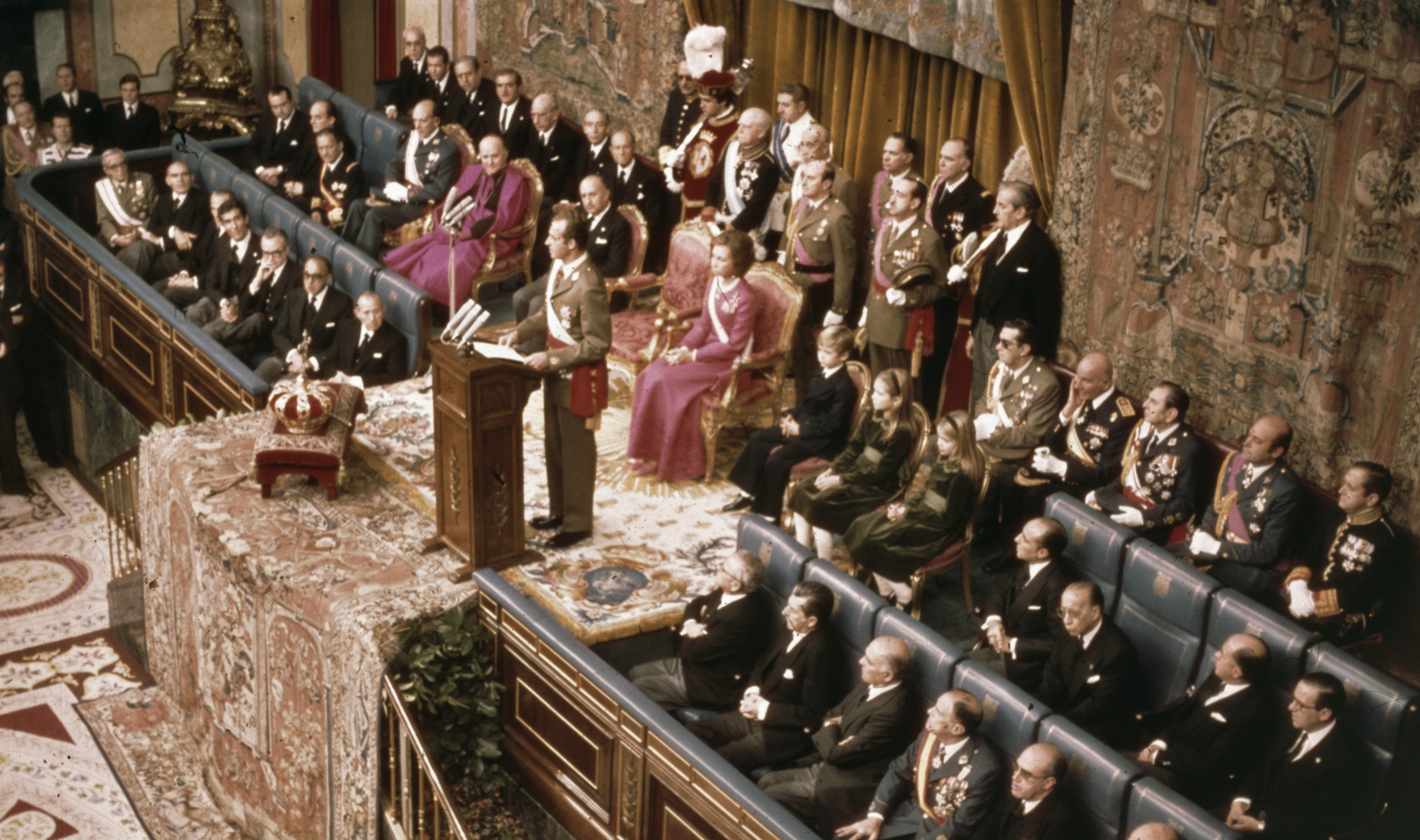
Proclamation as king at the Palacio de las Cortes on 22 November 1975

In 1969, the dictator Francisco Franco designated Juan Carlos de Borbón as his successor "by title of king" with the title of Prince of Spain, by virtue of the Law of Succession to the Headship of the State of 1947.

After Franco's death on November 20, 1975, the Regency Council assumed interim rule. Two days later, Juan Carlos I was proclaimed king before the Francoist Cortes. He delivered a speech in which he avoided referencing Franco's triumph in the Spanish Civil War and in which, after expressing his "respect and gratitude" to Franco, he stated that he intended to reach "an effective consensus of national concord". In this way, he made it clear that he did not support the pure "immobilist continuism" advocated by the búnker ─ which defended the perpetuation of Francoism under the monarchy established by Franco, following the model established in the Organic Law of the State of 1967─ but with a message to the Army to face the future with "serene tranquility" that hinted that the reform would be made from the regime's own institutions.

On 27 November, a Mass of the Holy Spirit was celebrated in the church of San Jerónimo el Real in Madrid to inaugurate his reign. He opted not to call himself Juan III or Carlos V, but Juan Carlos I. Accompanied by his wife Sofia, he was escorted beneath a canopy to a set of thrones set up near the high altar. Following the service, the king and queen returned to the palace, where they greeted the people from the balcony, reviewed troops, and attended a formal banquet.

Juan Carlos is reported to have been pressured by Valéry Giscard d'Estaing to personally tell Chilean dictator Augusto Pinochet, who had traveled to Spain for Franco's funeral, not to attend his inauguration. Pinochet attended the proclamation at the Palacio de las Cortes, but not the follow-up Te Deum. In private Pinochet expressed later his disapproval of what he saw as a lack of recognition of Franco by Juan Carlos I in his speech at the Cortes.

== Felipe VI ==
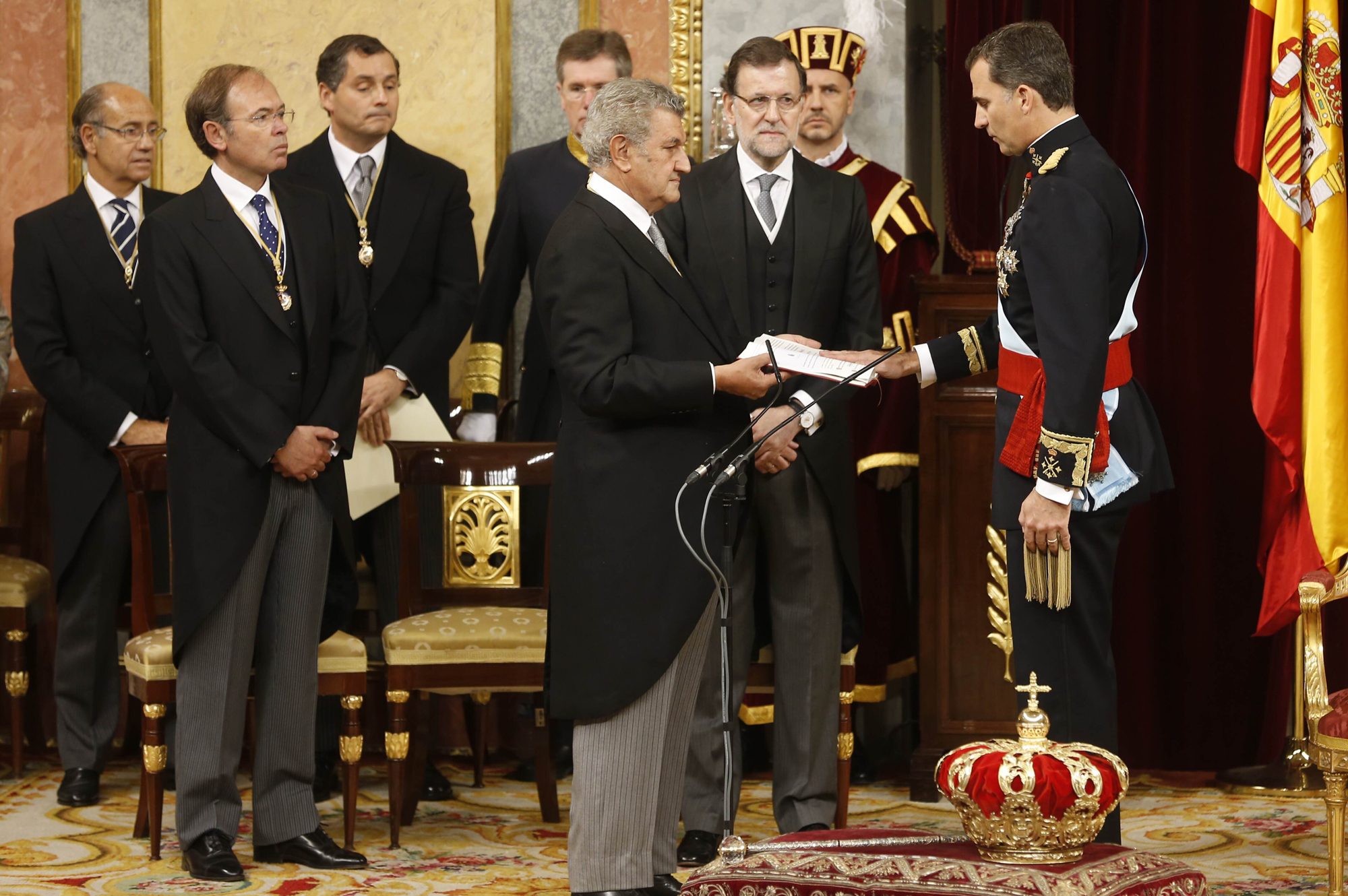
Felipe VI takes the oath before the Cortes Generales during the proclamation ceremony at the Palacio de las Cortes, Madrid, 19 June 2014.

On 2 June 2014, King Juan Carlos announced his intent to abdicate in Felipe's favor. As required by the Constitution of Spain, the Council of Ministers began deliberations the following day on an organic law to give effect to the abdication. The law had to be passed by a majority of all members of the Congress of Deputies, the lower house of the Cortes Generales. According to Jesús Posada, the president of the Congress of Deputies, Felipe could be proclaimed king as early as 18 June. On 4 June, El País of Madrid reported that Felipe would indeed be proclaimed king on 18 June.

Felipe ascended the throne on the formal publication of the organic law in the Boletín Oficial del Estado at midnight on 19 June; his father had given his sanction to the organic law effecting his abdication just hours earlier. The next morning, after receiving the Captain General's sash from his father (symbolizing the transfer of royal and military power), he was formally sworn in and proclaimed king in a low-key ceremony held in the Cortes. He swore to uphold the Constitution before formally being proclaimed king by Posada. Upon his accession, he became the youngest monarch in Europe, being nine months younger than King Willem-Alexander of the Netherlands.

== Sources ==
- Juliá, Santos (1999). Un siglo de España. Política y sociedad [A century of Spain. Politics and society] (in Spanish). Madrid: Marcial Pons. ISBN 84-9537903-1.
- Preston, Paul (2003). Juan Carlos. El Rey de un pueblo [Juan Carlos. The King of a people] (in Spanish). Barcelona: Plaza & Janés. ISBN 84-01-37824-9.
- Tusell, Javier (1997). La transición española. La recuperación de las libertades (in Spanish). Madrid: Historia 16-Temas de Hoy. ISBN 84-7679-327-8.
