= Church of Santa María la Mayor (Talavera de la Reina) =

Church building in Castile-La Mancha, Spain

- Iglesia de Santa María la Mayor
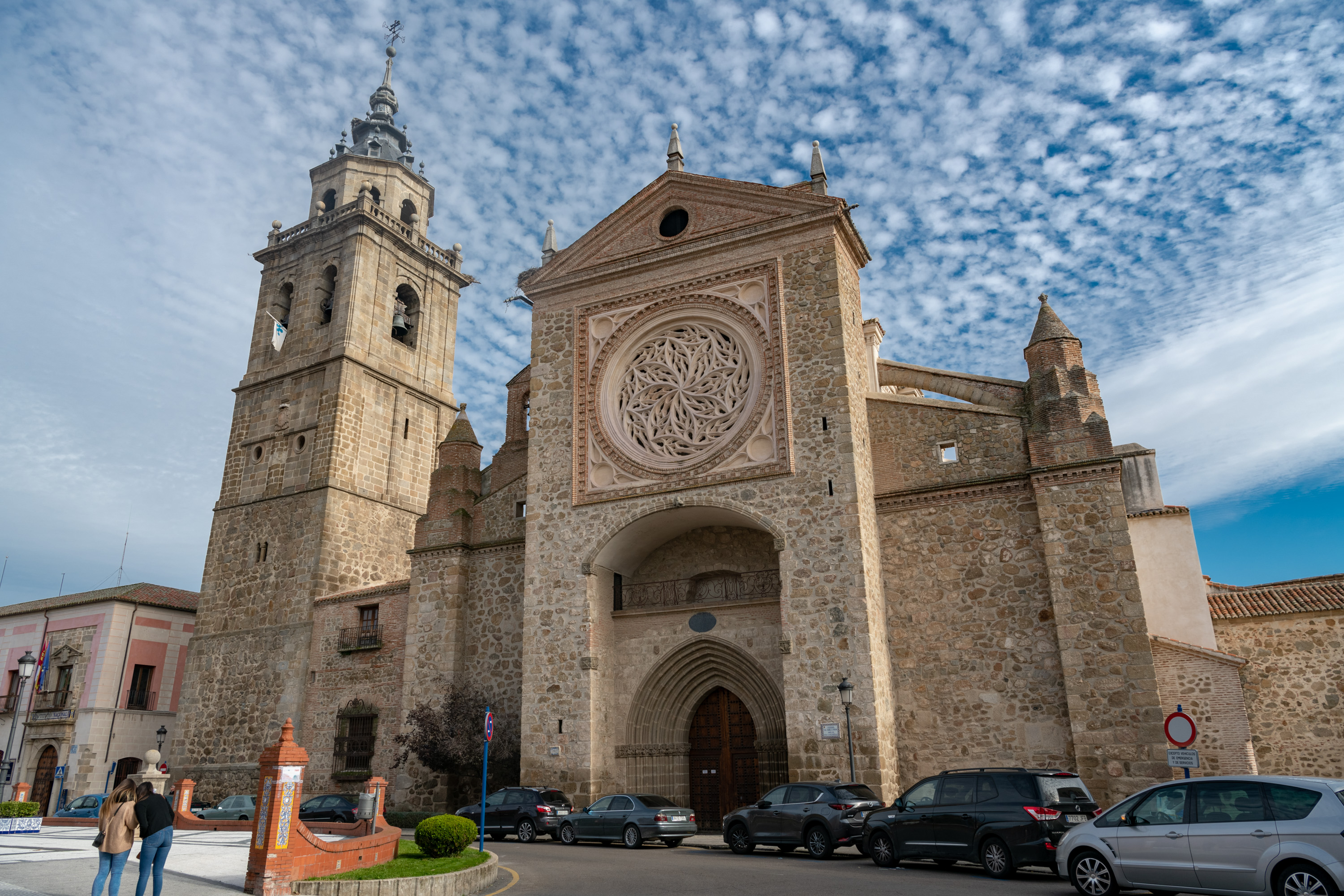
- Interactive map of the Church of Santa María la Mayor area

General information
- Architectural style: Gothic–Mudéjar
- Classification: Bien de Interés Cultural
- Location: Plaza del Pan, Talavera de la Reina, Spain
- Coordinates: 39.958064°N 4.832109°W

The Church of Santa María la Mayor (Spanish: Iglesia de Santa María la Mayor) is a Catholic church in Talavera de la Reina. It is known as colegiata de Santa María, as it was a collegiate church from 1211 to 1851.

== History and description ==
The earlier written mention to the church dates back at least to 1194. The site was the place were the old mosque was built. The church was promoted to the status of collegiate church in 1211 by the Archbishop of Toledo Rodrigo Jiménez de Rada.

It displays striking similarities with the Monastery of Guadalupe, both sharing the same Gothic–Mudéjar style.

The attached cloister was built by 1469. A number of chapels, either in gothic or Renaissance style, were built in the 15th and 16th centuries. The works in the façade ended in 1783. It endured a sacking during the French invasion in the context of the Peninsular War.

The temple lost the status of collegiate church in 1851.

== Conservation ==
It was declared monumento histórico-artístico (precursor to the status of Bien de Interés Cultural) in 1931.
