= Teofilo Ruiz =

Cuban-American medieval historian (born 1943)

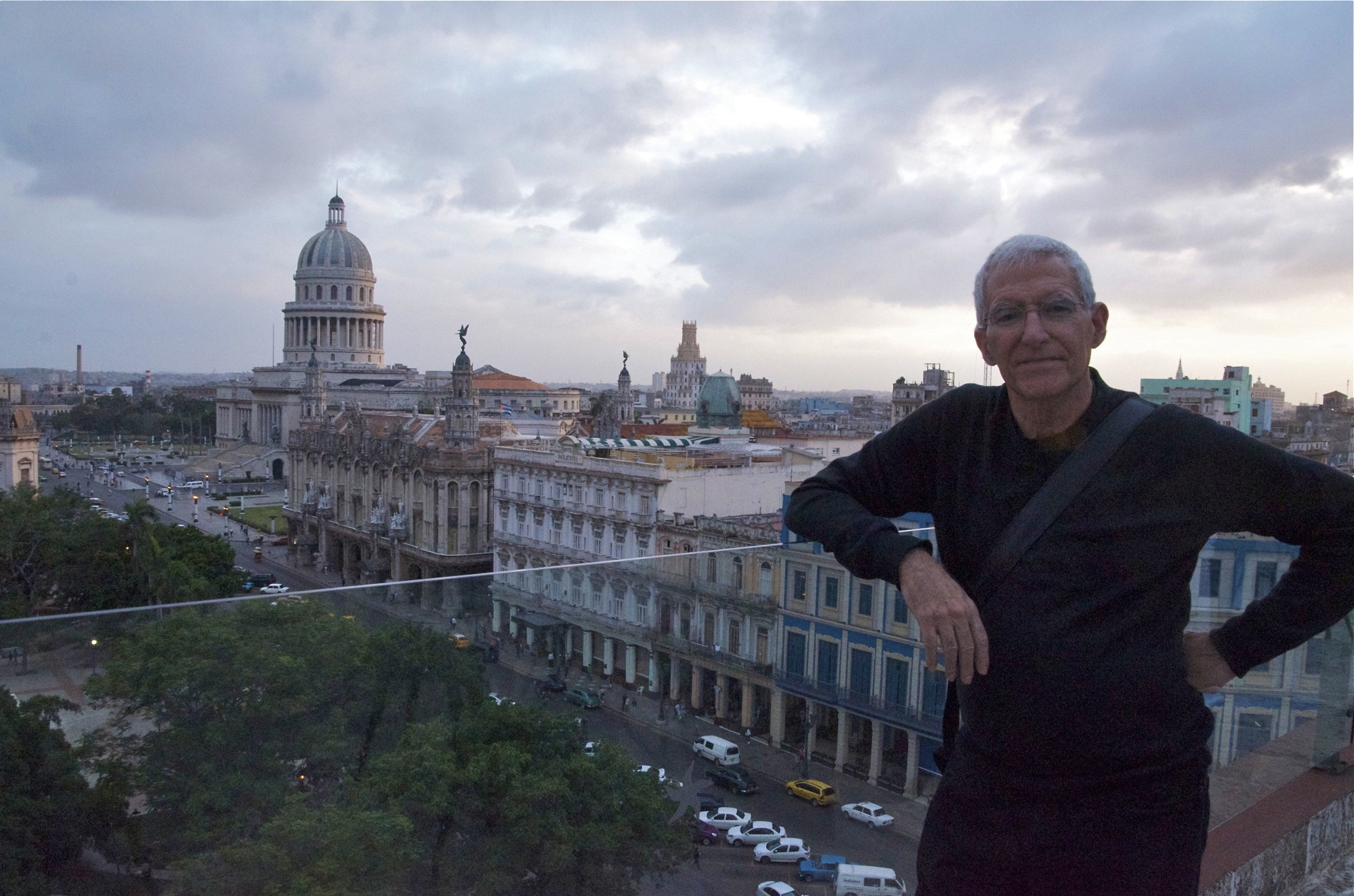
- Ruiz in 2012
- Born: Teofilo Fabian Ruiz; January 2, 1943 (age 83); Cuba

Academic background
- Education: CUNY Graduate Center; New York University; Princeton University

Academic work
- Discipline: European medieval history

Teofilo F. Ruiz (born 1943) is a Cuban-American medieval historian and professor currently at University of California, Los Angeles (UCLA). In 2012, he was awarded the National Humanities Medal by former President Barack Obama. He is consistently rated as one of the most popular professors at UCLA, and has published many books as well as dozens of articles in scholarly journals as well as reviews and smaller articles.

== Early life ==
Born in Cuba, Ruiz was active during the Cuban Revolution. At age of 17, he fought against the regime of Fulgencio Batista. When his friend was killed in 1960, he resigned from the revolution and was immediately imprisoned. Ruiz was eventually released after the failed Bay of Pigs Invasion (1961) in order to make room for new prisoners of war.

In 1961, Ruiz left Cuba for Miami with "only three changes of clothing, $45, a box of Cuban cigars to sell and a Spanish translation of Jacob Burckhardt's A History of Greek Civilization." By 1962, Ruiz and two cousins moved from Miami to New York City. He worked at various jobs including as a taxi driver for one year. Despite many obstacles, Ruiz finished his dissertation in the Graduate School of Princeton University by 1974.

== Career ==
Ruiz was a student of American medievalist Joseph Strayer and received his Doctor of Philosophy from Princeton University in 1974. Besides UCLA, he has taught at Brooklyn College, the CUNY Graduate Center, the University of Michigan, Michigan State University, the École des Hautes Études en Sciences Sociales, and Princeton University. He served as chair of the UCLA Department of History from 2002 to 2005. He has lectured in the US, Spain, Italy, France, England, Mexico, Brazil, Argentina, and nations in Asia.

In 2008, Ruiz was named chair of the UCLA Department of Spanish and Portuguese.

== Awards and honors ==
In 1994 he was selected by the Carnegie Foundation as one of the four Outstanding Teachers of the Year in the United States.

In 2007, Ruiz was awarded a Guggenheim Fellowship for his project on festivals, rituals, and power in late medieval and early modern Spain.

On February 13, 2012 former President Barack Obama awarded Ruiz a 2011 National Humanities Medal at the White House.

In 2013, Ruiz was elected into American Academy of Arts and Sciences and the same year was named Phi Beta Kappa Visiting Scholar.

Ruiz is honored in UCLA's Covel Commons as a recipient of the UCLA Alumni Association's Distinguished Teaching Award.

== Works ==
- Spanish Society, 1348-1700 (2017) Second edition
- Spain's Centuries of Crisis: 1300 - 1474 (2011)
- Braudel Revisited: The Mediterranean World 1600-1800, eds. Gabriel Piterberg, Geoffrey Symcox and Teofilo Ruiz (University of Toronto Press, 2018).
- Medieval Europe and the World : From Late Antiquity to Modernity, 400-1500 (2005) ISBN 0-19-515693-5
- From Heaven to Earth: The Reordering of Castilian Society in the Late Middle Ages (2004) ISBN 0-691-00121-9
- Spanish Society, 1400–1600 (Social History of Europe) (2002) ISBN 0-582-28691-3
- Crisis and Continuity: Land and Town in Late Medieval Castile (1994) ISBN 0-8122-3228-3
- The City and the Realm: Burgos and Castile 1080–1492 (1992) ISBN 0-86078-329-4
- Medieval Spain, 711-1492 ISBN 1-57524-052-1
- Medieval Europe: Crisis and Renewal. Course No. 863 The Teaching Company ISBN 1-56585-710-0
- The Terror of History: Mystics, Heretics, and Witches in the Western Tradition. Course No. 893 The Teaching Company, 2002
- Other 1492: Ferdinand, Isabella, and the Making of an Empire. Course No. 899 The Teaching Company

== Tours ==
He leads tours for Far Horizons Archaeological and Cultural trips.

== See also ==
- Medieval Spain
