= Royal Collegiate Church of Saint Hippolytus =

- Real Colegiata de San Hipólito
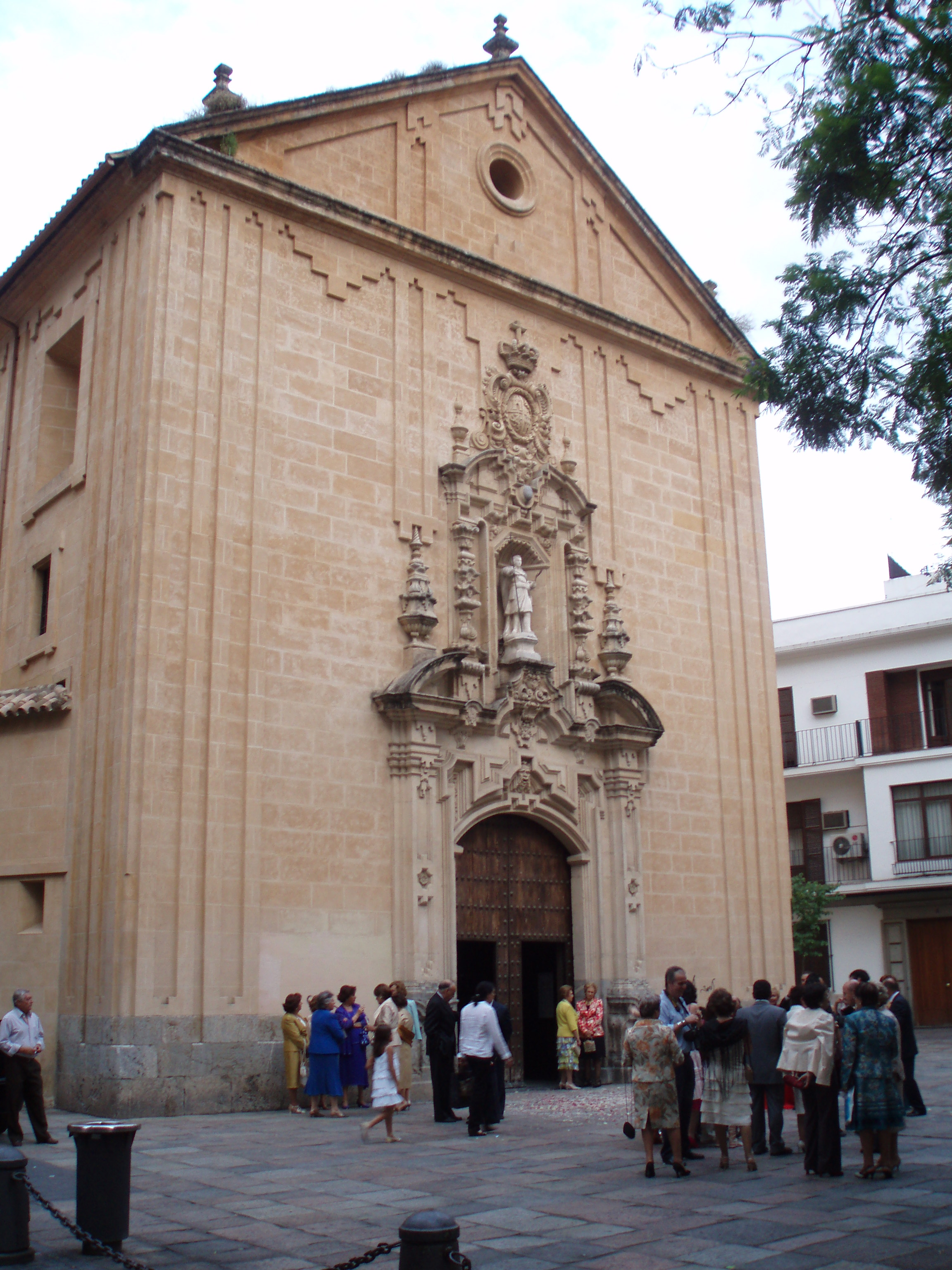

Religion
- Affiliation: Roman Catholic
- Region: Andalusia
- Patron: Saint Hyppolytus of Rome

Location
- Location: Córdoba, Spain
- Country: Spain
- Interactive map of Royal Collegiate Church of Saint Hippolytus
- Coordinates: 37°53′09″N 4°46′59″W

Architecture
- Style: Gothic and Baroque
- Groundbreaking: 1343
- Completed: 1736

Website
- www.jesuitascordoba.es/index.php?option=com_content&view=article&id=32&Itemid=482

The Royal Collegiate Church of Saint Hippolytus (Real Colegiata de San Hipólito in Spanish) is a Catholic Church in Córdoba, (Spain) founded in 1343 at the initiative of King Alfonso XI of Castile. The church, which was later granted in perpetuity to the Society of Jesus, contains the tombs of King Ferdinand IV and his son Alfonso XI.

== Background ==
The Royal Collegiate Church of Saint Hippolytus was part of a monastery founded by King Alfonso XI of Castile in 1343 to commemorate the victory of the Christian troops in the Battle of Salado, fought in 1340. The king wanted it to be his final resting place and also that of his father Ferdinand IV who had died in 1312 and had been interred in the Mosque–Cathedral of Córdoba.

On 1 August 1347, Pope Clement VI issued a papal bull raising the rank of the church to that of a collegiate church so that it could be used to celebrate, with due solemnity, the Divine Offices in memory of kings. King Alfonso's devotion to Saint Hippolytus is reflected in a document issued on 2 October in Seville by which he ordered the clergy in Jerez de la Frontera and Sanlúcar de Barrameda to celebrate anniversary masses for the souls of his ancestors on different days, particularly on the feast day of Saint Hippolytus which coincided with the day on which the king had been born.

Work on the construction of the church progressed very slowly and only the apse and the crossing had been completed during the reigns of Alfonso XI and of his son and successor, King Peter I. The rest of the building was not completed until the 18th-century when, in 1729, the construction of the church was resumed with the acquiescence of King Philip V of Spain. Seven years later, in 1736 the work had been completed although several other structures were built during the 18th and the 19th centuries.

During the reign of Queen Isabel II of Spain the church lost its classification as a collegiate church, although it is still known by that name, and remained open for religious services. At the end of the 19th-century, it was granted in perpetuity to the Jesuits who continue to govern it today.

== Tombs of Kings Ferdinand IV and Alfonso XI ==
In September 1312, a few days after his death in Jaén the remains of King Ferdinand IV were transferred to the city of Córdoba and on the 13th of the same month, interred in a chapel at the Mosque-Cathedral although originally he was to be buried either at the Cathedral of Toledo near his father Sancho IV or in the Cathedral of Seville next to his paternal grandfather Alfonso X and his great-grandfather Ferdinand III. Because of the high temperatures in that month, his widow, Queen Constance and the king's brother, Peter of Castile decided to bury the king at the Mosque-Cathedral in Córdoba which was nearer to the place where he had died.

His son, King Alfonso XI died in March 1350 during the Great Plague, at the Fifth Siege of Gibraltar. His remains were first interred in the Royal Chapel in the Cathedral of Seville, near his ancestors, although his wish had been to be buried in the Church of Saint Hippolytus near his father. In 1371, when the Royal Chapel at the Mosque-Cathedral in Córdoba had been completed, Alfonso's son, Henry II, ordered that this father's remains were to be interred there next to King Fernando IV.

The tombs of both kings remained in the Royal Chapel until the evening of 8 August 1736 when they were transferred to the Church of Saint Hippolytus

On 12 May 2008, the church was declared a Bien de Interés Cultural (Spanish Property of Cultural Interest), reference number RI-51.0012151-0000.

== Gallery ==
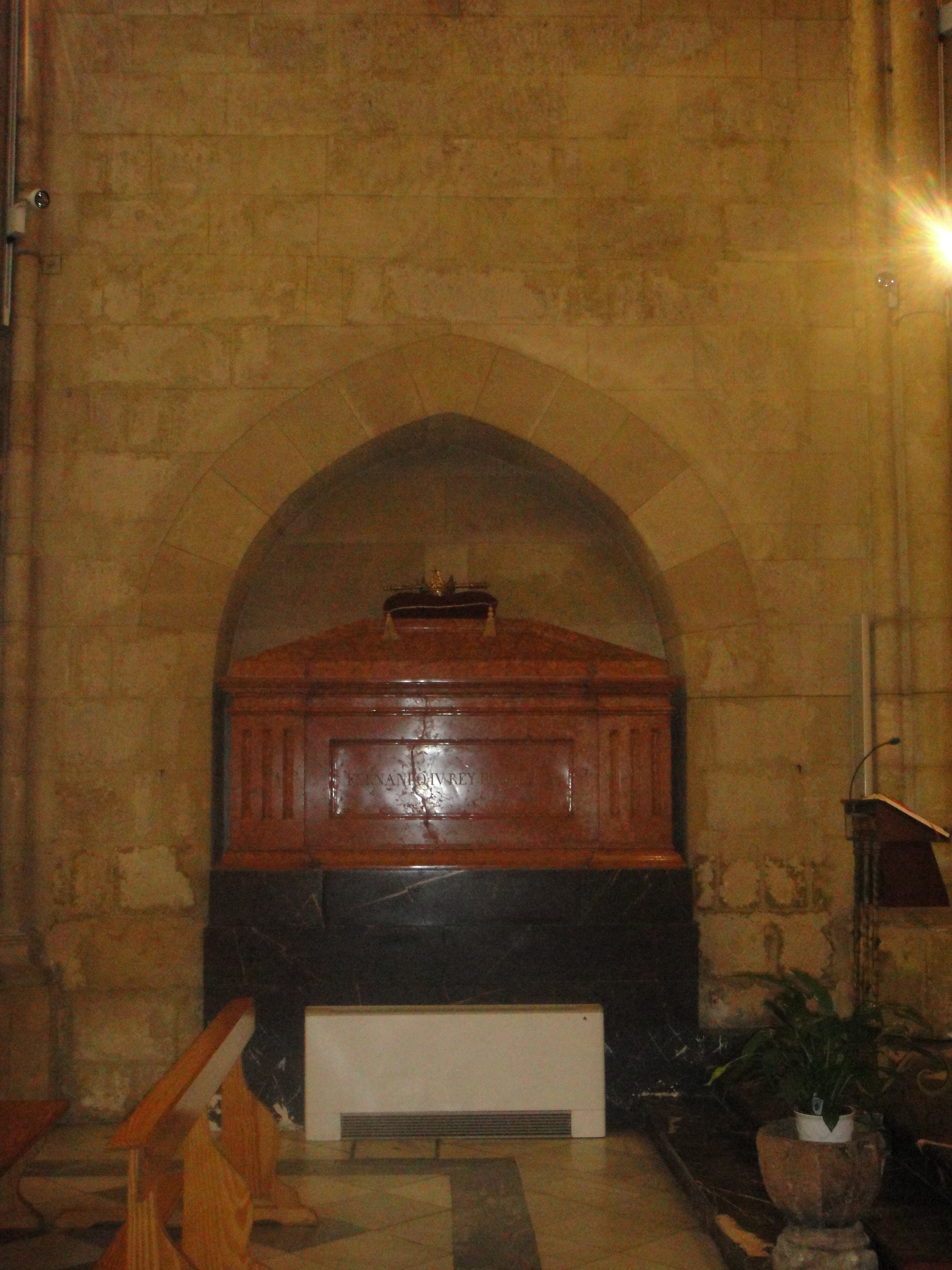
Tomb of King Ferdinand IV of Castile

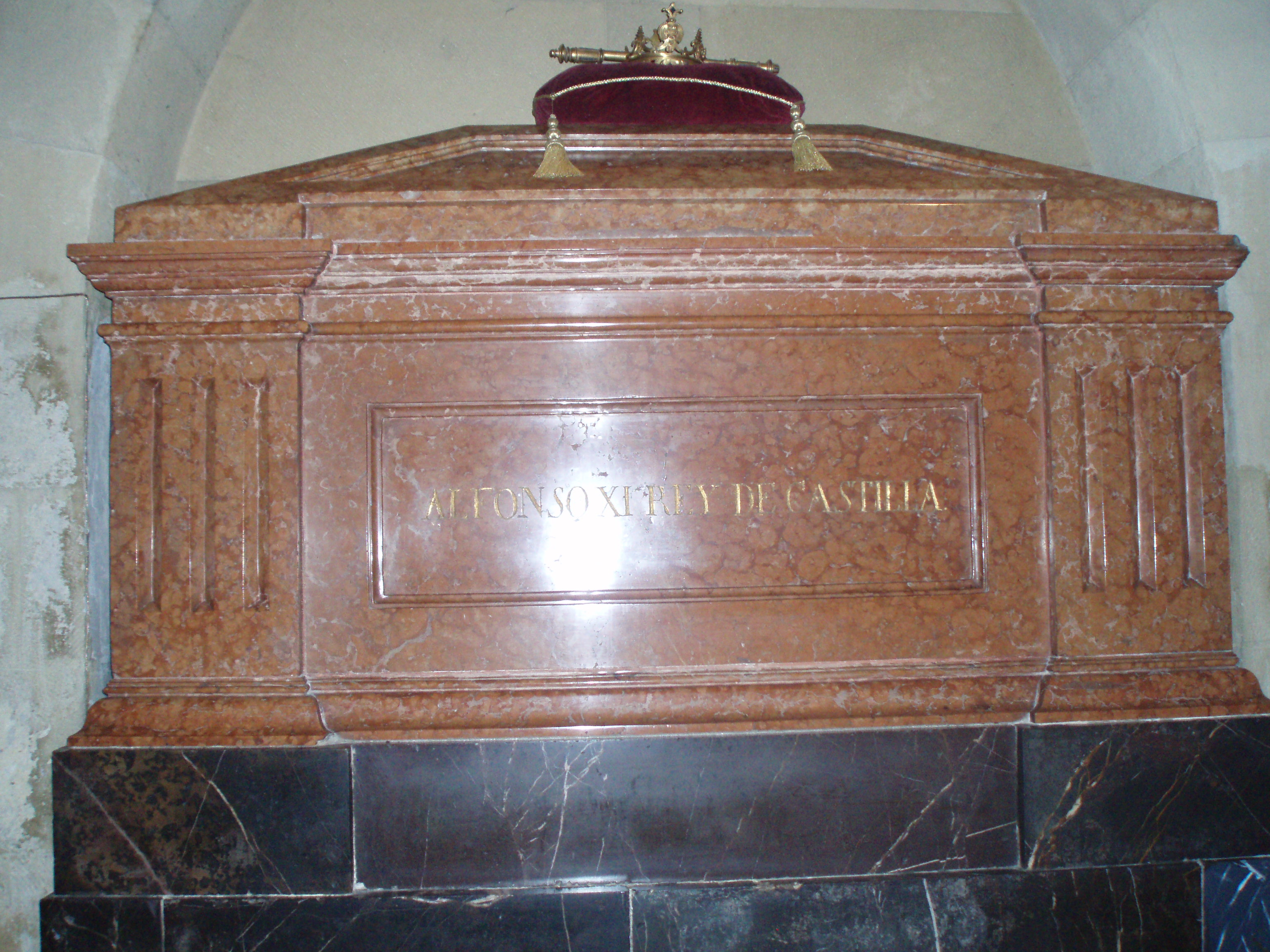
Tomb of King Alfonso XI of Castile

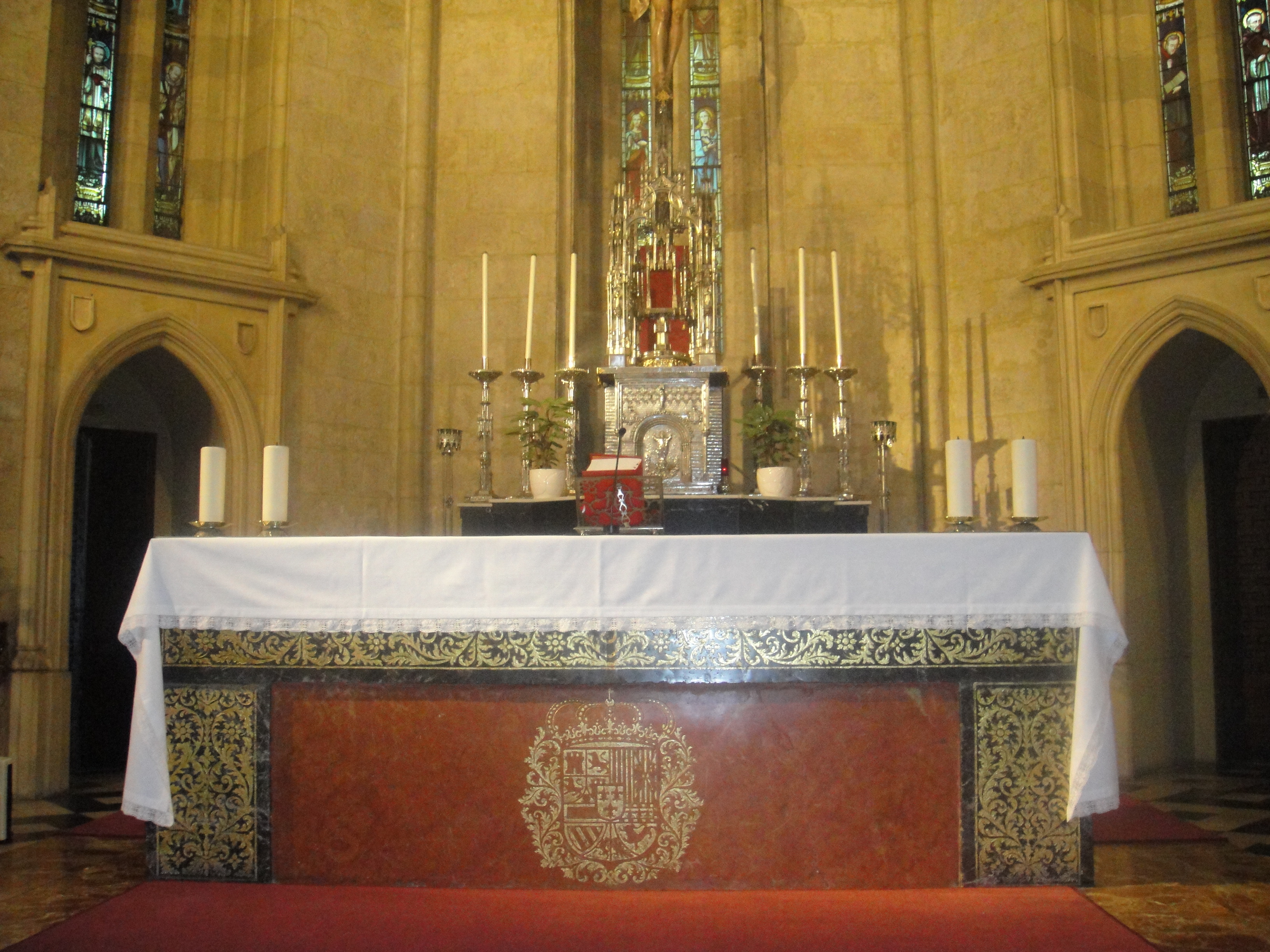
High altar and tabernacle.

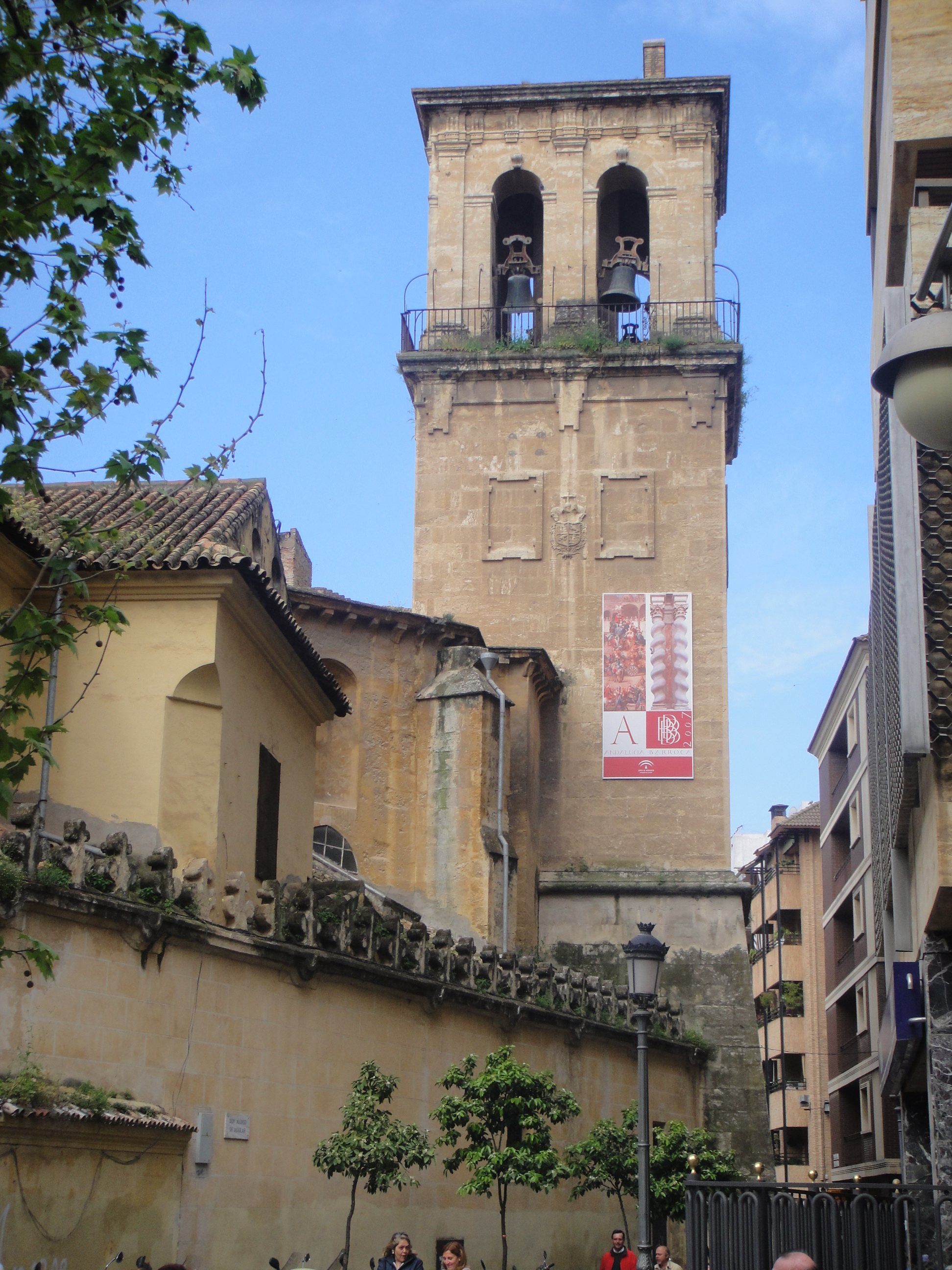
Tower of the church

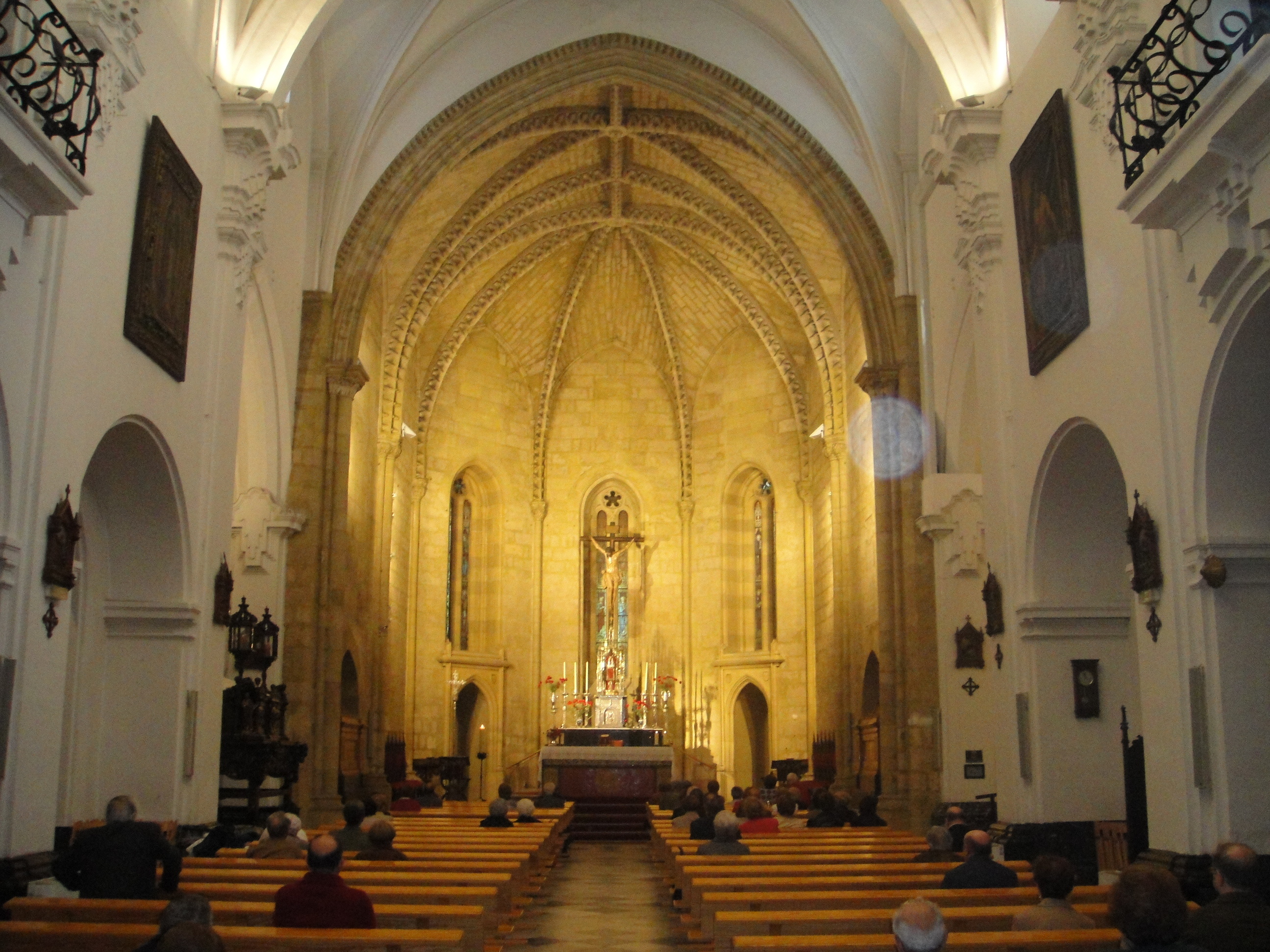
Interior of the church

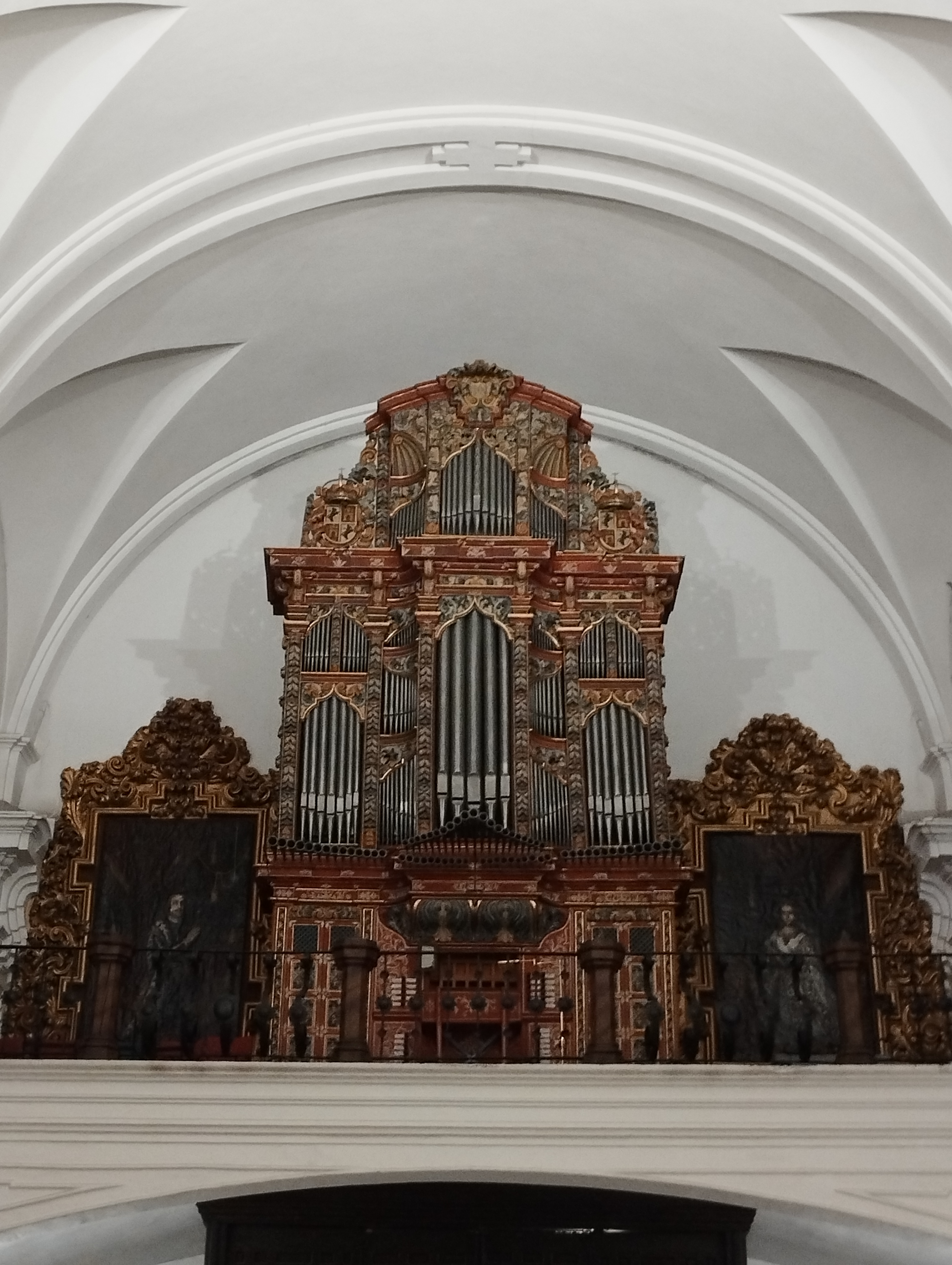
Organ of the Royal Collegiate Church of Saint Hippolytus in Cordoba

== Bibliography ==
- Arco y Garay, Ricardo del (1954). Sepulcros de la Casa Real de Castilla. Madrid: Instituto Jerónimo Zurita. Consejo Superior de Investigaciones Científicas. OCLC 11366237.
- Elorza, Juan C.; Vaquero, Lourdes; Castillo, Belén; Negro, Marta (1990). Junta de Castilla y León: Consejería de Cultura y Bienestar Social (ed.). El Panteón Real de las Huelgas de Burgos. Los enterramientos de los reyes de León y de Castilla (in Spanish). León: Editorial Evergráficas S.A. ISBN 978-84-241-9999-9.
- García Fernández, Manuel (1988). "Regesto documental andaluz de Alfonso XI (1312-1350)" (PDF). Historia, Instituciones, Documentos (in Spanish) (15). Seville: Universidad de Sevilla: Departamento de Historia Medieval y Ciencias y Técnicas Historiográficas: 1–126. ISSN 0210-7716.
- Villar Movellán, Alberto (1995). Guía artística de la provincia de Córdoba. Coordinator/Director (over 30 authors). Córdoba: Servicio de Publicaciones de la Universidad de Córdoba. ISBN 978-84-7801-285-5.
