= Tello Alfonso =

Spanish noble

- Lord of Aguilar de Campoo
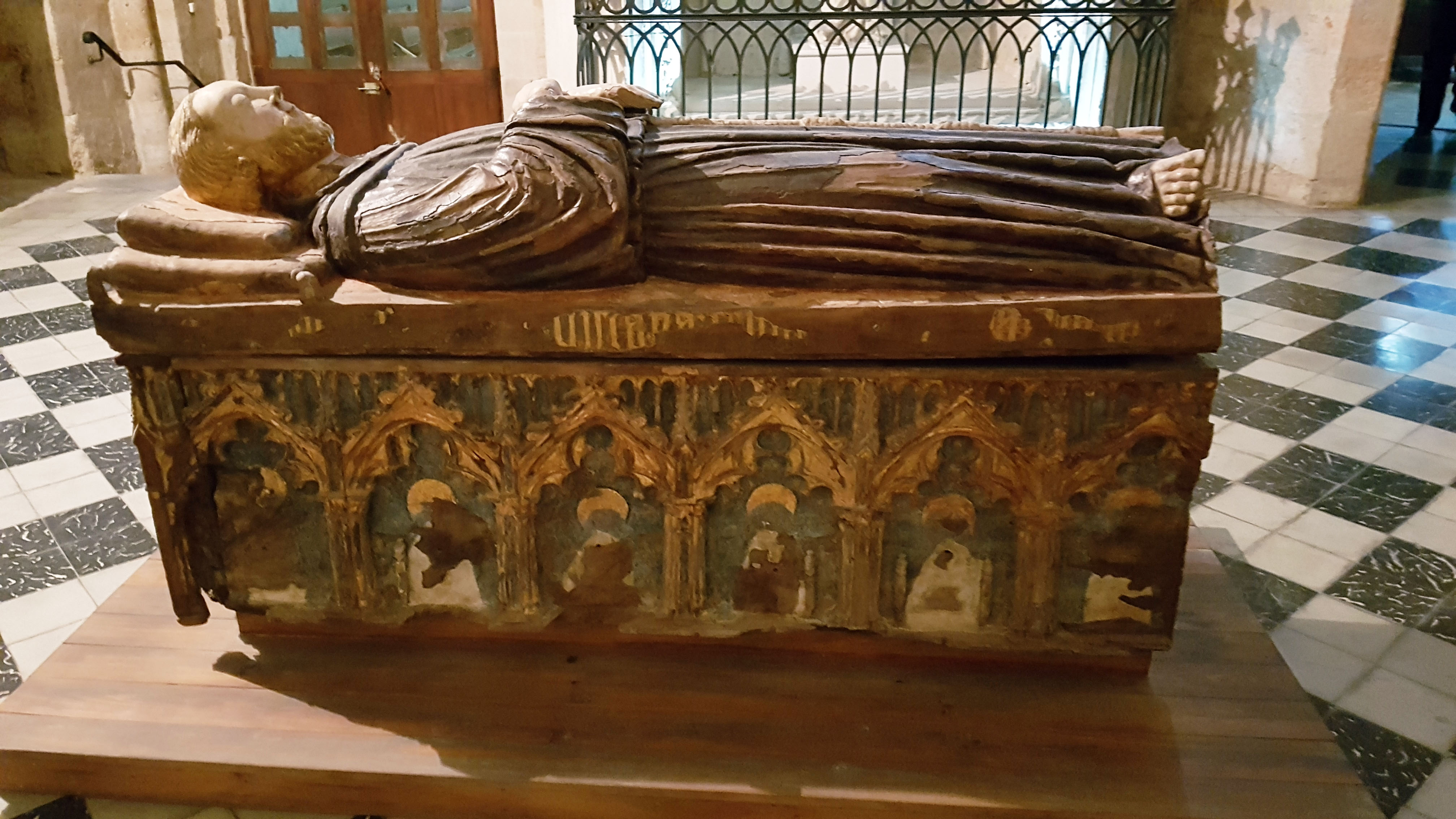
- Sarcophagus of Tello of Castille in the convent of Saint Francis in Palencia
- Born: 1337
- Died: October 1370 (aged 33)
- Noble family: Castilian House of Ivrea
- Spouse: Juana of Lara
- Issue: See Issue
- Father: Alfonso XI of Castile
- Mother: Eleanor of Guzman

Tello Alfonso of Castile (1337 – October 1370) was the seventh of the ten illegitimate children of Alfonso XI of Castile and Eleanor of Guzman. He was a prince of Castile and First Lord of Aguilar de Campoo. In Spanish he is known as Tello de Castilla, Infante de Castilla; Señor de Aguilar de Campoo, de Vizcaya, de Castañeda y de Lara.

== Biography ==
He was born in Seville. He participated along with his brothers in the struggles against the despotic rule of his half-brother Pedro of Castile also known as Pedro the Cruel.

== Family ==
In 1353 he married Juana of Lara (daughter of Juan Núñez III de Lara), but she was reportedly murdered in 1359, on orders of King Peter (Pedro the Cruel). Tello and Juana had no legitimate children. It is reported that Tello kept the news of her death secret in order to maintain possession of her dowry.

Tello had many illegitimate children:

- Juan Tellez de Castilla, Señor de Aguilar de Campoo (1355-1385). He died at the Battle of Aljubarrota. From his marriage to Leonor Lasso de la Vega arose the Marquesses of Aguilar de Campoo (Grandees of Spain).
- Alfonso Tellez de Castilla, b. 1365
- Pedro Enríquez de Castilla, Señor de Camporredondo, b. 1370
- Fernando Tellez de Castilla
- Constanza Tellez de Castilla
- Leonor Tellez de Castilla
- Isabel Tellez de Castilla
- Juana Tellez de Castilla
- María Tellez de Castilla

== Ancestors ==
Ancestors of Tello Alfonso

8. Sancho IV of Castile
4. Ferdinand IV of Castile
9. María de Molina
2. Alfonso XI of Castile
10. Denis of Portugal
5. Constance of Portugal
11. Elizabeth of Aragon
Tello, Lord of Aguilar de Campoo
12. Álvaro Perez de Guzman
6. Pedro Núñez de Guzmán
13. Maria Giron
3. Eleanor of Guzman
14. Fernán Pérez Ponce de León
7. Beatriz Ponce de León
15. Urraca Gutiérrez de Meneses
