= João Afonso Telo, 1st Count of Barcelos =

Lord of Albuquerque and Count of Barcelos

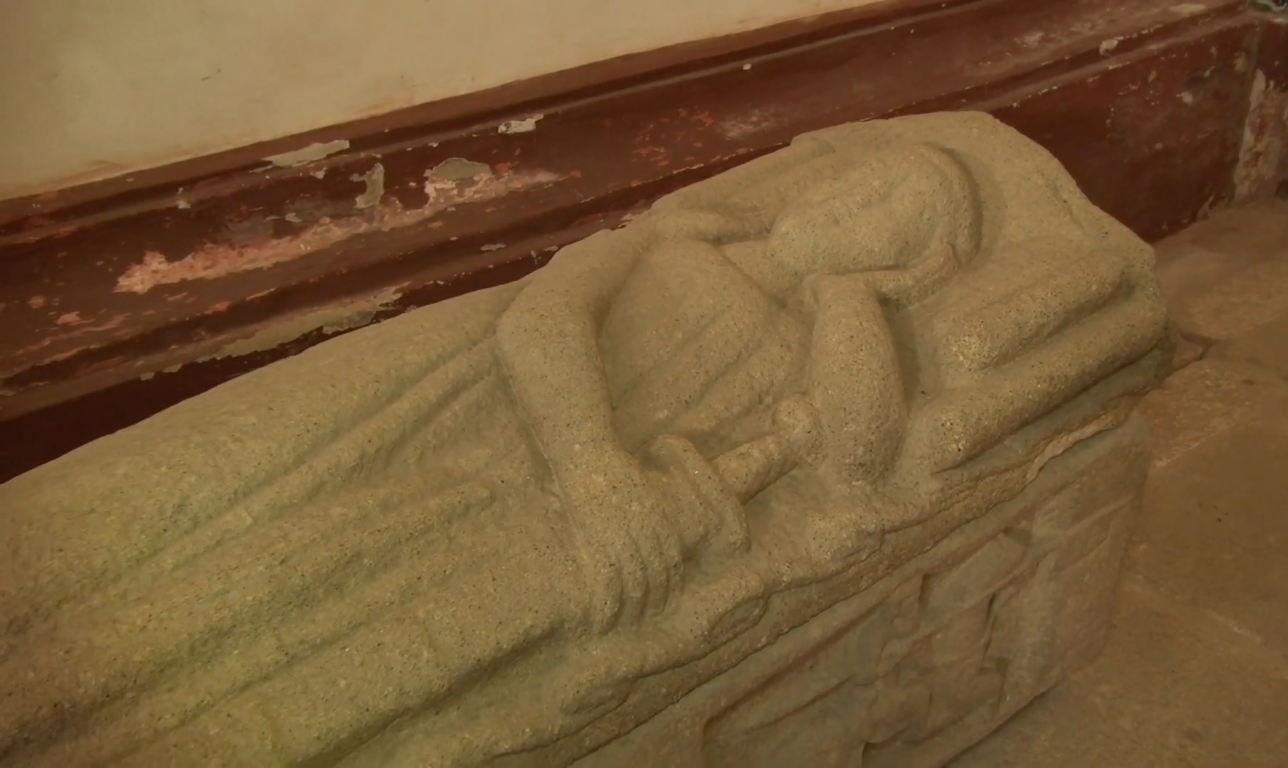
Recumbent effigy of the Count of Barcelos, Monastery of Santa Maria de Pombeiro

João Afonso Telo (died May 1304), was the 4th Lord of Albuquerque and the 1st Count of Barcelos.

== Family origins ==
João Afonso Telo was the son of Rodrigo Anes de Meneses, 3rd Lord of Albuquerque, and Teresa Martins de Soverosa, daughter of Martim Gil de Soverosa and Inés Fernández de Castro. His paternal grandparents were João Afonso Telo, 2nd Lord of Albuquerque, and his wife Elvira González Girón.

== Life ==
A Castilian and Portuguese nobleman, he returned to Portugal, the birthplace of his parents, where he served King Denis as his mordomo-mor and was entrusted with important diplomatic missions as the king's ambassador and trusted advisor. A member of the curia regis, he confirmed many royal charters. In March 1279, he confirmed the fueros of Alfaiates and in 1297 played a key role in the negotiations prior to the signing of the Treaty of Alcañices.

He was named the first Count of Barcelos on 8 May 1298 by King Denis who in 1302 appointed him ambassador to Castile. He executed his last will on 5 May 1304 and probably died in the same month.

== Marriage and issue ==
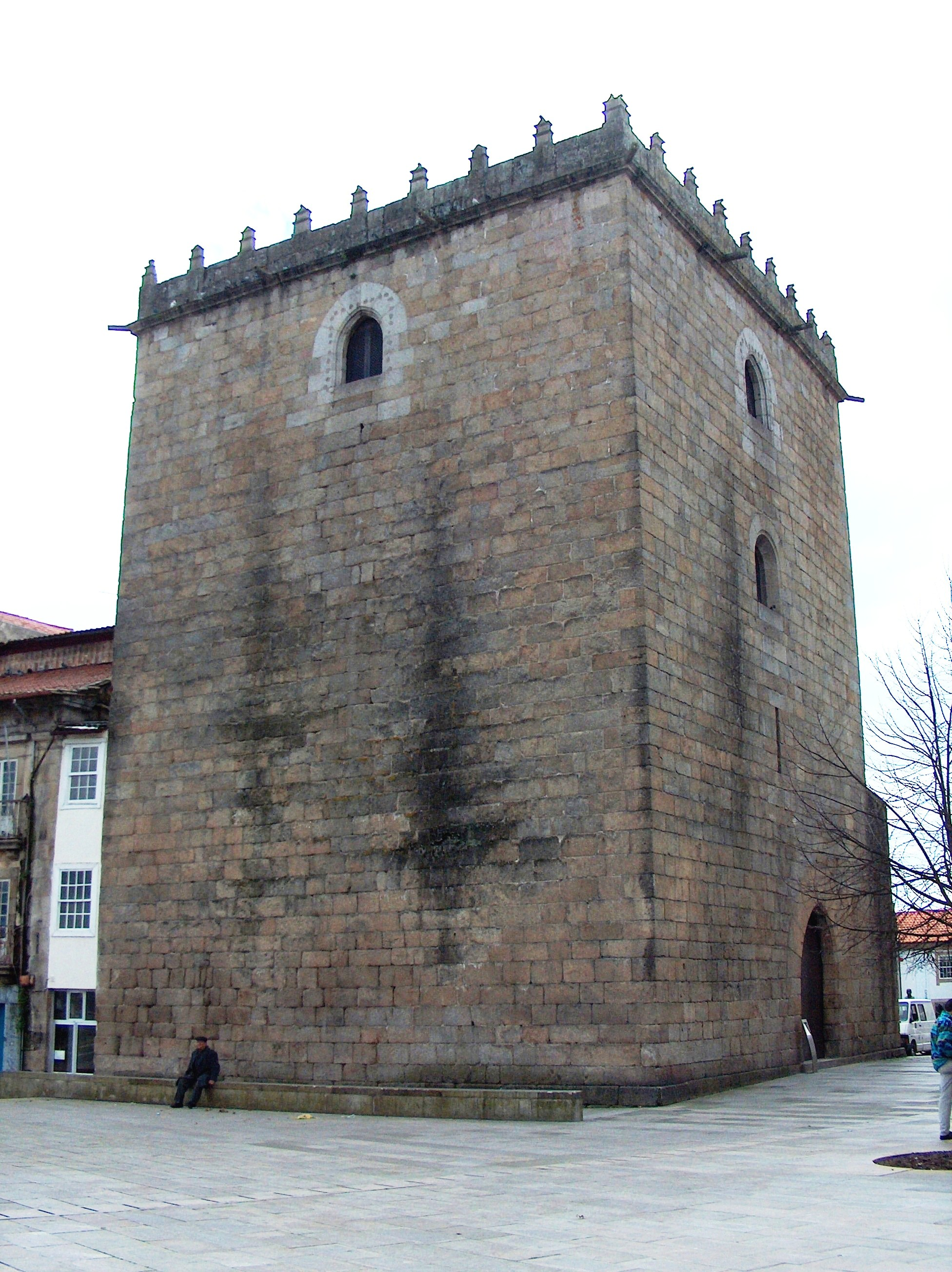
Torre da Porta Nova in Barcelos

He married Teresa Sánchez, an illegitimate daughter of King Sancho IV of Castile. (Note: After her first husband’s death, she married Ruy Gil de Villalobos with whom she had a daughter named María de Villalobos, executor of the will of her nephew João Afonso de Albuquerque. and the second wife of Lopo Fernandes Pacheco.) Two daughters were born of this marriage:

- Teresa Martins Telo (died after 1341), was the 5th Lady of Albuquerque and the wife of Afonso Sanches, an illegitimate son of King Denis of Portugal and Aldonça Rodrigues Talha. She and her husband founded the Monastery of Santa Clara in Vila do Conde in 1318. They had one son João Afonso de Albuquerque, mayordomo mayor of King Peter of Castile who is suspected of having him poisoned in 1354.
- Violante Sanches Telo (died before November 1312), the wife of Martim Gil de Riba de Vizela who was named 2nd Count of Barcelos on 15 October 1304 and was the alférez of King Denis.

== Bibliography ==
- Fernandes, Fátima Regina (1972). "A extinção da descendência varonil dos Menezes de Albuquerque em Castela e suas implicações na administração do seu património em Portugal" (PDF). Revista da Faculdade de Letras, História, Universidade do Porto, Série I (in Portuguese). No. 1. pp. 1453–1467. ISSN 0871-164X.
- Rei, António (2001). "Os Riba de Vizela, Senhores de Terena". Callipole: Revista de cultura (in Portuguese). No. 9. Vila Viçosa: Câmara Municipal de Vila Viçosa. pp. 13–22. ISSN 0872-5225. Archived from the original on 2013-11-19.
- Sotto Mayor Pizarro, José Augusto (1997). Linhagens Medievais Portuguesas: Genealogias e Estratégias (1279-1325 (in Portuguese). Vol. I and II. Oporto: Doctorate thesis, author’s edition. hdl:10216/18023.|
- Sotto Mayor Pizarro, José Augusto P. (1987). Os Patronos do Mosteiro de Grijo: Evolução e Estrutura da Familia Nobre Séculos XI a XIV (in Portuguese). Oporto.
