= Lopo Fernandes Pacheco =

- Lord of Ferreira de Aves
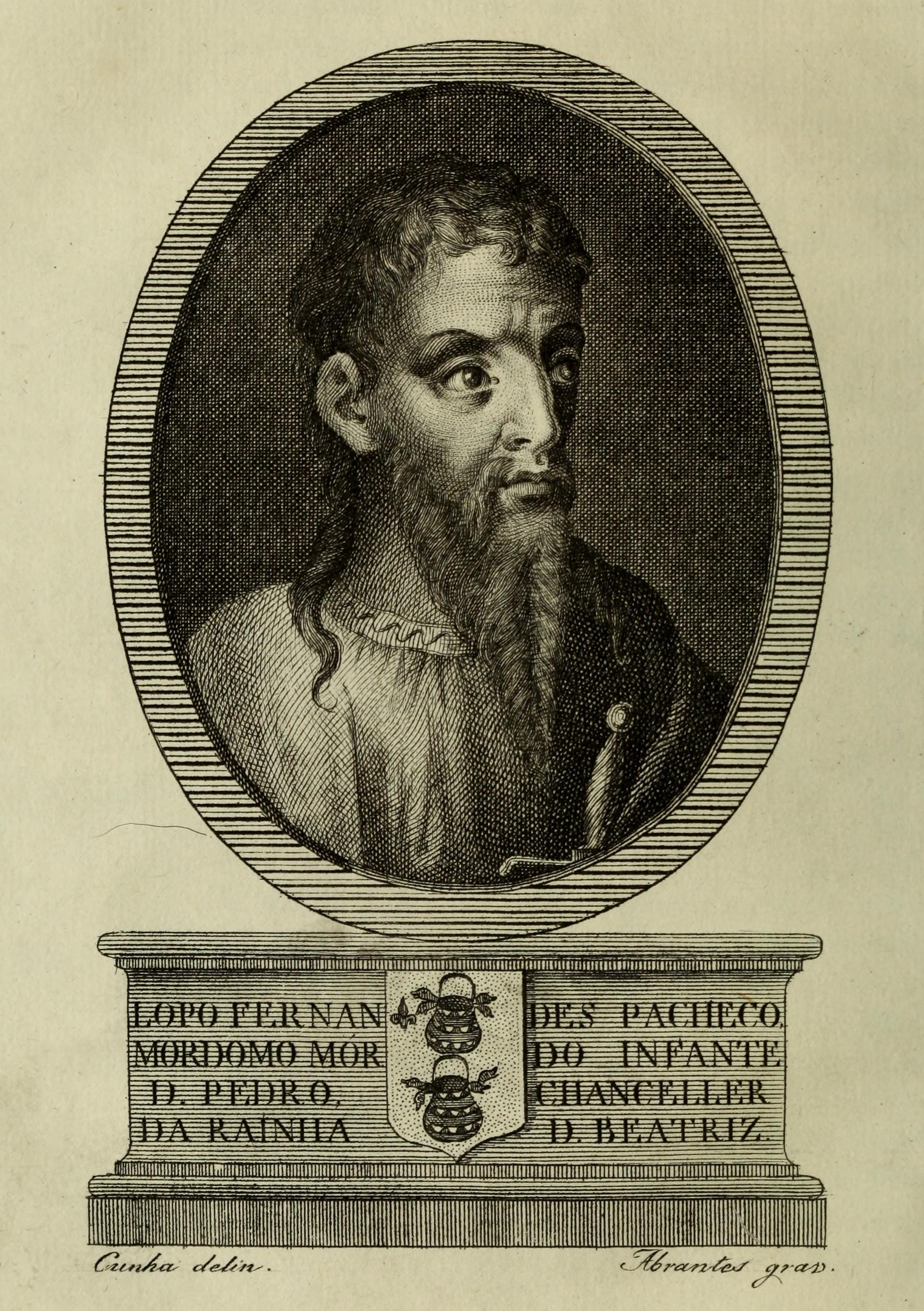
- Born: Kingdom of Portugal
- Died: 22 December 1349; Lisbon, Kingdom of Portugal
- Buried: Lisbon Cathedral
- Father: João Fernandes Pacheco
- Mother: Estevaínha Lopes de Paiva

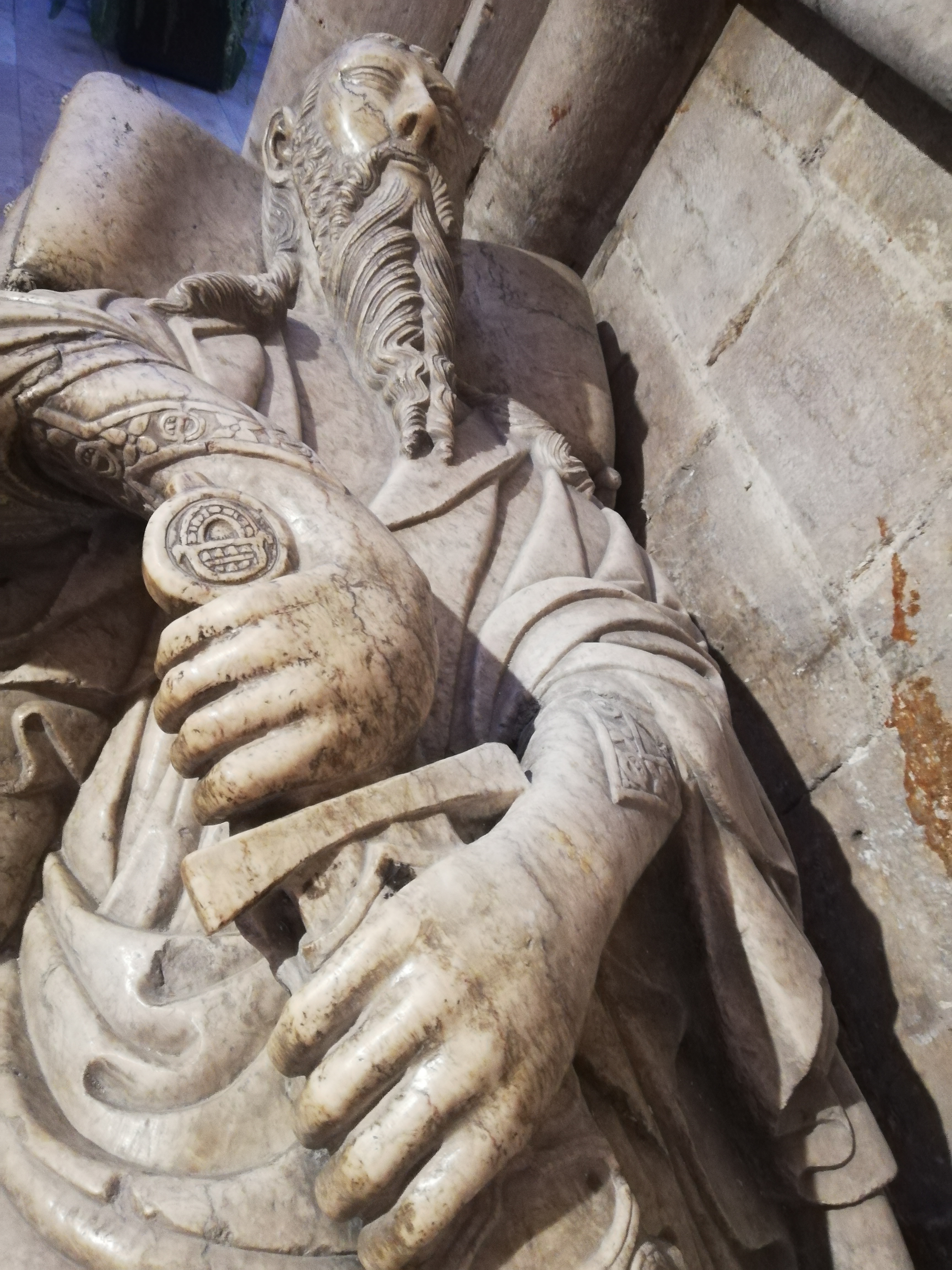
Tomb effigy

Lopo Fernandes Pacheco (died 22 December 1349), was the first of his lineage to accede to the highest ranks of the nobility, that of a rico-homem, in the Kingdom of Portugal. He lived during the reign of King Afonso IV of Portugal of whom he was his favorite and loyal vassal. His parents were João Fernandes Pacheco and his wife Estevaínha Lopes de Paiva, daughter of Lope Rodrigues de Paiva and Teresa Martins Xira. His family owned properties in different parts of the kingdom although its area of influence was mainly Beira in the northern part of the country.

== Life ==
The rise of his lineage in the Kingdom of Portugal, a process by which members of the lower nobility gradually displaced the old lineages, began with Lopo Fernandes Pacheco, the first Lord of Ferreira de Aves. A great favorite of the monarch, he was perhaps one of the most prominent personalities during the reign of Afonso IV of Portugal. He occupied several posts in the kingdom: merino-mor (1329); mordomo-mor of Infante Pedro, the future King Pedro I of Portugal; and, member of the king's council. He was also the mordomo-mor (1334-1336) and chancellor (1349) of Queen Beatrice of Castile, the wife of King Afonso IV, and, in 1327 was one of the executors of the will of Queen Elizabeth of Aragon, the wife of King Denis of Portugal. King Afonso IV entrusted Lopo with the education of his children, the infantes Peter and Eleanor, the future queen of Aragon by her marriage to King Peter IV.

He appears in 1317 with Infante Afonso and in 1318 was one of the witnesses when Afonso made several donations to the Monastery of Saint Denis in Odivelas. He sided with Afonso against the pretensions of his half-brother, Afonso Sanches and was at his side in 1322 when the brothers signed the peace treaty in Pombar.

King Afonso IV entrusted Lopo with several diplomatic missions as the ambassador to the Holy See and to the kingdoms of Castile and Aragon. He was one of the forty nobles who were held hostage to ensure compliance with the Treaty of Ágreda, originally signed in 1304 and ratified in 1328 by King Alfonso IV and King Alfonso XI of Castile.

In 1340, Lopo was one of the many nobles who fought alongside the Portuguese king in the Battle of Río Salado in support of King Alfonso XI of Castile.

Due to his constant presence in the curia regis, most of his estates, purchased or donated by the King, were situated along the Tagus in the Santarém District as well as in Lisbon and surrounding areas. As compensation for his services to the royal family and for having raised two of the infantes, he received the lordship of Ferreira de Aves from King Alfonso IV "... and was raised by King Alfonso IV from his natural status as a knight to the category of rico-homem, jointly with his son Diogo Lopes Pacheco".

Sepulchre of Lopo Fernandes Pacheco at Lisbon Cathedral

Lopo Fernandes Pacheco died on 22 December 1349 and was buried in Lisbon Cathedral, also the final resting place of King Alfonso IV. His sarcophagus, one of the most beautiful ones in the cathedral, is in the Chapel of Saint Cosme and Saint Damian. The most relevant events of his life and his marriage were engraved on a stone slab, commissioned by King Afonso IV, which was placed on the wall above his sarcophagus.

== Marriage and issue ==
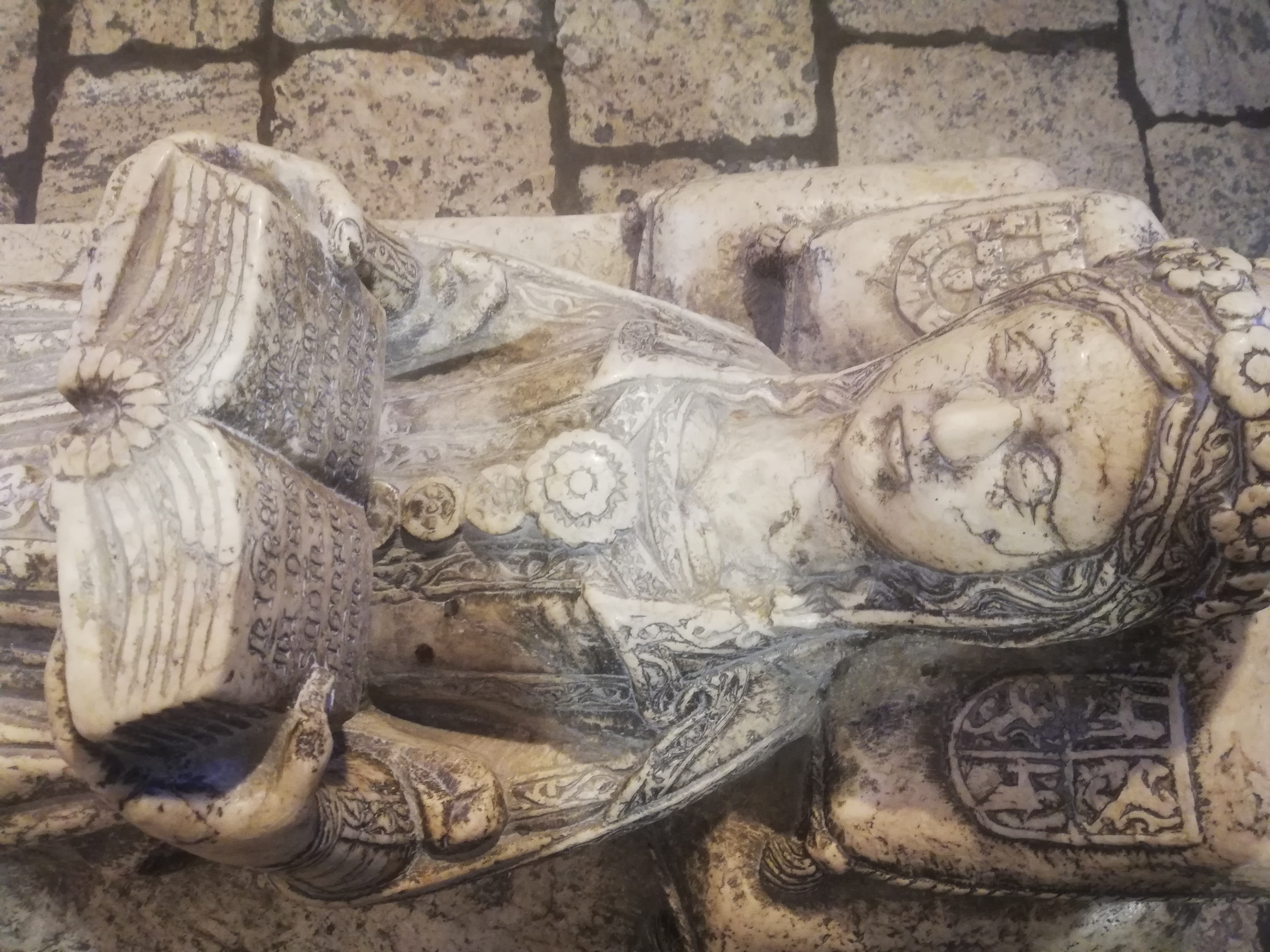
Tomb effigy of Pacheco's second wife, María Rodríguez de Villalobos, in the Sé de Lisboa; she reads a Book of Hours.

Lopo Fernandes Pacheco married twice. His first marriage was to Maria Gomes Taveira (died after 1331), daughter of Gomes Lourenço Taveira and Catarina Martins. They were the parents of:

- Diogo Lopes Pacheco (1304 – 1383), 2nd Lord of Ferreira de Aves and one of the nobles involved in the assassination of Inés de Castro, the reason for which he had to flee Portugal and seek refuge in Castile. Diogo married Joana Vasques Pereira, daughter of Vasco Pereira and Inês Lourenço da Cunha.
- Violante Lopes Pacheco. Her first husband was Martim Vasques da Cunha, Lord of Tábua and her second husband was Diogo Afonso de Sousa, Lord of Mafra, Ericeira y de Enxara dos Cavaleiros, with issue from both marriages.

By 1345 he was already married to his second spouse, María Rodríguez de Villalobos, who was still alive in 1367 and was the daughter of the Leonese noble Ruy Gil de Villalobos (died 1307) and of Teresa Sánchez, an illegitimate daughter of King Sancho IV of Castile, whose first husband was João Afonso Telo, 1st Count of Barcelos. María Rodríguez de Villalobos was the executor of the will of her nephew João Afonso de Albuquerque. The children of this marriage were:

- Guiomar Lopes Pacheco (died after 1404), the wife of João Afonso Telo, 4th Count of Barcelos.
- Isabel Fernandes Pacheco, also known as Isabel de Ferreira, married to Alfonso Pérez de Guzmán, 1st Lord of Gibraleón and of Olvera.
- Maria Lopez Pacheco y Villalobos, married to Don Juan García de Saavedra, 12th lord of Saavedra (died in 1362).

== Bibliography ==
- Fernandes, Fátima Regina (1972). "A extinção da descendência varonil dos Menezes de Albuquerque em Castela e suas implicações na administração do seu património em Portugal" (PDF). Revista da Faculdade de Letras, História, Universidade do Porto. Série I (in Portuguese) (1): 1453–1467. ISSN 0871-164X.
- Fernandes, Fátima Regina (2005). "A nobreza, o rei e a fronteira no medievo peninsular". En la España Medieval (in Portuguese) (27). Madrid: Universidad Complutense de Madrid: 155–176. ISSN 0214-3038.
- Lourenço, Vanda (2006). "Lopo Fernandes Pacheco: Um valido de D. Afonso IV" (PDF). Estudios Humanísticos. Geografía, historia y arte (in Portuguese) (5). León: Universidad de León: 49–69. doi:10.18002/ehh.v0i5.3078. ISSN 1696-0300.
- Salazar y Castro, Luis de (1697). Historia de la Casa de Lara. Vol. III. Madrid: Imprenta Real. Por Mateo de Llanos Guzmán.
- Sotto Mayor Pizarro, José Augusto (1997). Linhagens Medievais Portuguesas: Genealogias e Estratégias (1279-1325) (in Portuguese). Oporto: Doctorate thesis, author’s edition. hdl:10216/18023.
- Sotto Mayor Pizarro, José Augusto P. (1987). Os Patronos do Mosteiro de Grijo: Evolução e Estrutura da Familia Nobre Séculos XI a XIV (in Portuguese). Vol. I. Oporto.
