= Gonçalo Mendes de Sousa =

Portuguese nobleman (1124–1190)

- Rico-Homen
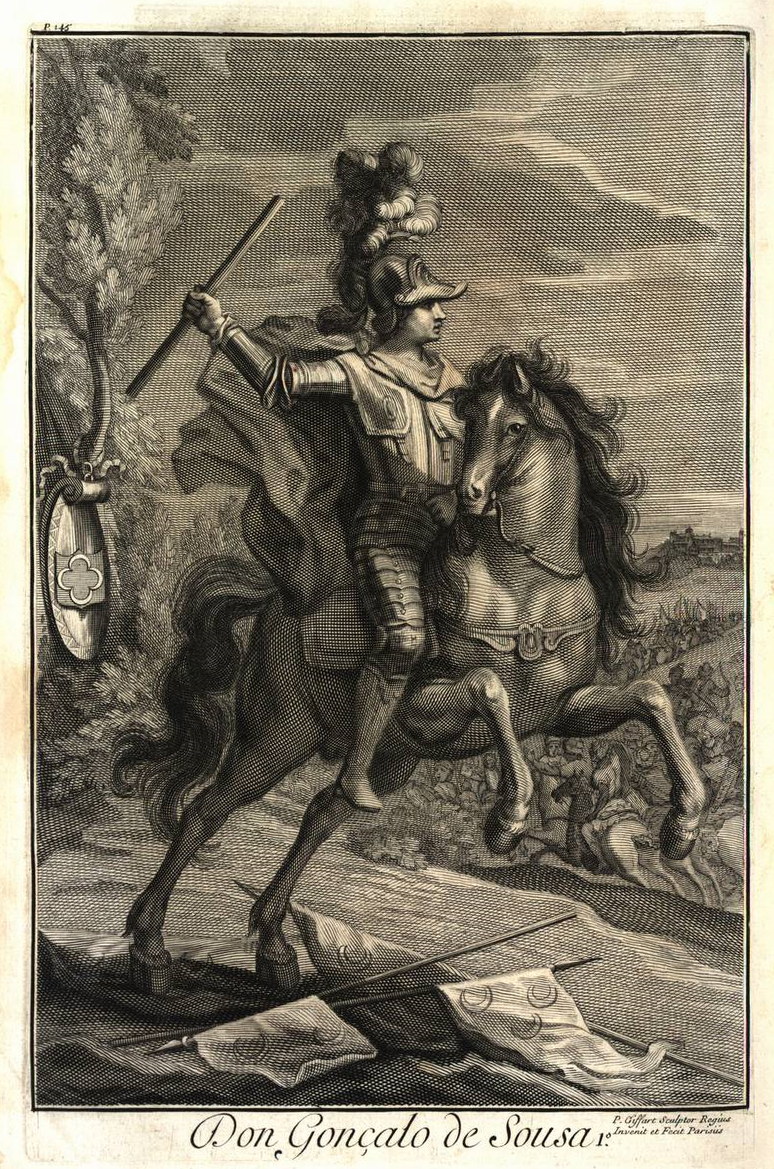

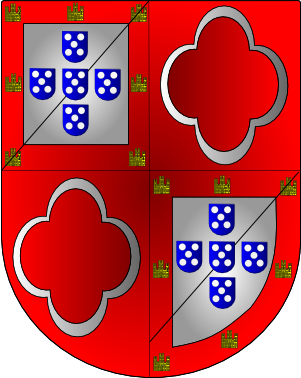
- Coat of arms
- Predecessor: Mem Viegas de Sousa
- Born: 1124; County of Portugal
- Died: 1179; Kingdom of Portugal
- Buried: Monastery of Santa Maria de Pombeiro
- Noble family: House of Sousa
- Spouses: Urraca Sanches de Celanova; Dórdia Viegas de Ribadouro; Sancha Álvares
- Issue: Mendo de Sousa; Teresa Gonçalves de Sousa; Elvira Gonçalves de Sousa; Fernando Gonçalves de Sousa; Marinha Gonçalves de Sousa
- Father: Mem Viegas de Sousa
- Mother: Teresa Fernandes de Marnel

Gonçalo Mendes de Sousa The Good (1124–1179) was a Portuguese nobleman and adviser to Afonso Henriques, who gave him land in Couto de Pombeiro (Felgueiras).

== Biography ==
Gonçalo was the son of Mem Viegas de Sousa and Teresa Fernandes de Marnel, and grandson of Egas Gomes de Sousa and Gontinha Gonçalves da Maia, granddaughter of Trastamiro Aboazar.

His first wife was Urraca Sanches de Celanova, daughter of Sancho Nunes de Barbosa and Sancha Henriques (daughter of Henry, Count of Portugal and Theresa, Countess of Portugal). From this marriage he had Mendo de Sousa.

Gonçalo married a second time to Dórdia Viegas de Ribadouro (daughter of Egas Moniz and Teresa Afonso de Celanova) having two children: Teresa Gonçalves de Sousa and Elvira Gonçalves de Sousa.

There's mention of a third marriage with Sancha Álvares, with no children; and of two children with Goldora Goldores de Refronteira: Fernando Gonçalves de Sousa and Marinha Gonçalves de Sousa.
