= Mem Viegas de Sousa =

Portuguese nobleman (1070 – 1130)

- Rico-Homen
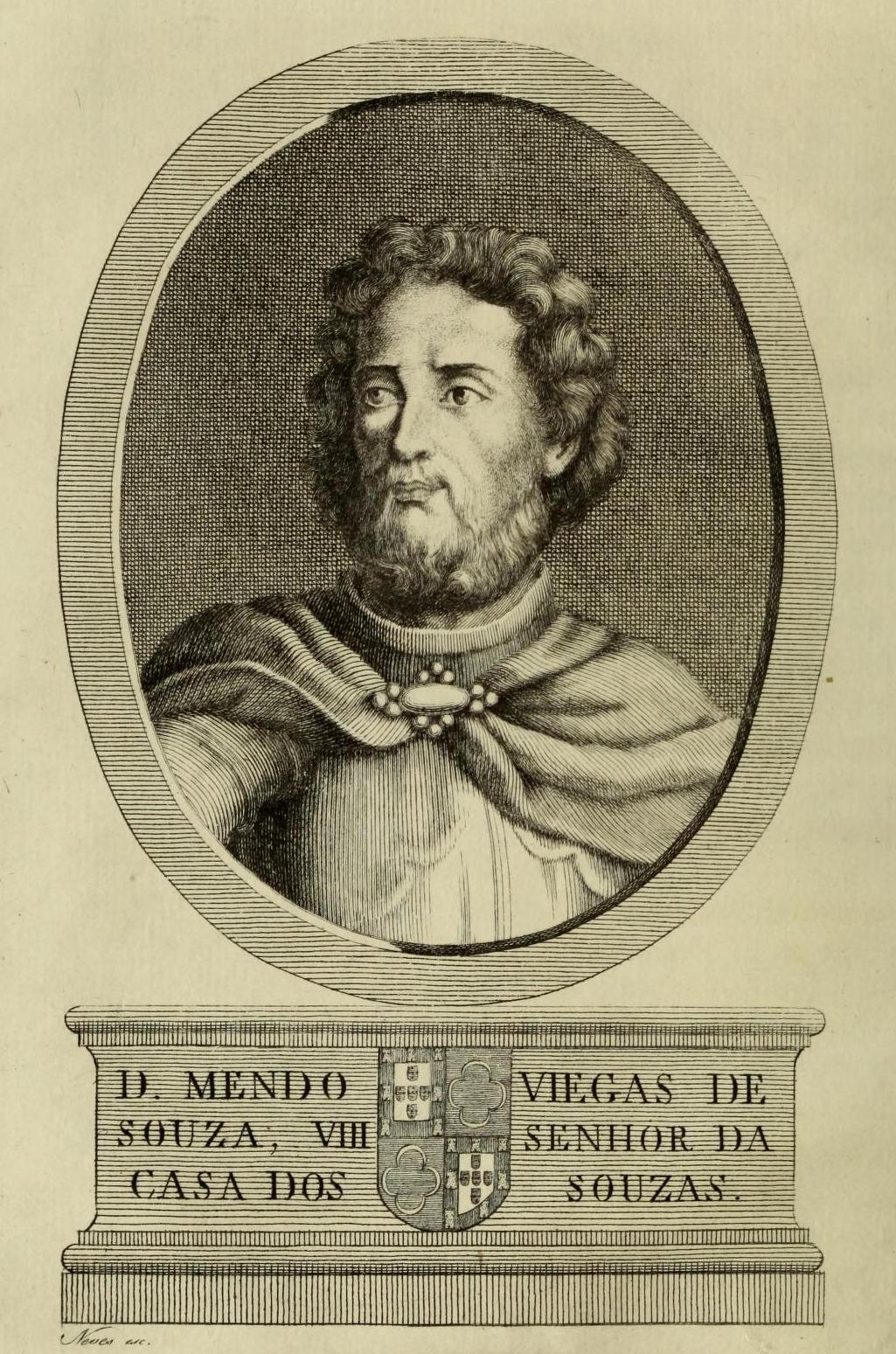

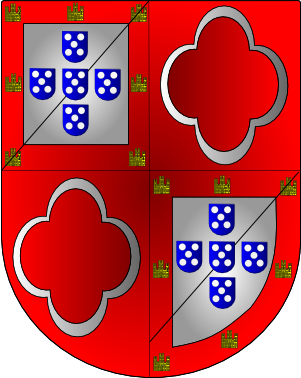
- Coat of arms
- Predecessor: Egas Gomes de Sousa
- Successor: Gonçalo Mendes de Sousa
- Born: 1070; County of Portugal
- Died: 1130 (aged 59–60)
- Noble family: House of Sousa
- Spouse: Teresa Fernandes de Marnel
- Issue: Gonçalo Mendes de Sousa; Soeiro Mendes de Sousa; Chamôa Mendes de Sousa; Gontinha Mendes; Urraca Mendes de Sousa
- Father: Egas Gomes de Sousa
- Mother: Gontinha Gonçalves da Maia

Mem Viegas de Sousa (1070 – 1130) was a nobleman who lived during the transition from the County of Portugal to the Kingdom of Portugal. He was Governor of the town of Santa Cruz de Riba Tâmega and castellan of the Castle of Santa Cruz de Riba Tâmega (Amarante). He held the Lordship of Sousa and due to the marriages of his children, he gave rise to a vast descent, that made the surname Sousa one of the most common in the Portuguese language.

== Biography ==
He was the son of Egas Gomes de Sousa (1035 –?) and Gontinha Gonçalves da Maia (1040 -?). He married Teresa Fernandes de Marnel (1070–?), with whom he had:

- Gonçalo Mendes de Sousa (1120 – 25 March 1190), “The Good” , married three times, the first time with Urraca Sanches de Celanova (1120–?), daughter of Sancho Nunes (1070 – 1130 , the second time with Dórdia Viegas (1130 -?), daughter of Egas Moniz, and the third time with Sancha Alvarez de Astúrias.
- Soeiro Mendes de Sousa “The Gross” (c. 1100 – 1137).
- Chamôa Mendes de Sousa ( 1085 –?) married Gomes Mendes Guedeão (1070 –?), son of Mem Guedaz Guedeão ( 1040 –?) and Sancha,
- Gontinha Mendes (1100 –?) married Mem Moniz de Riba Douro (c. 1100 –?), son of Monio Ermiges (1050 –?), lord of Ribadouro and Ouroana (1060 –?),
- Urraca Mendes de Sousa (1100 – 1160) married Egas Fafes de Lanhoso, son of Fáfila Lucides (1080 –?) and Dórdia Viegas (c. 1080 –?), lady of the Quinta de Sequeiros .
