= Mendo de Sousa =

Portuguese Count (12th Century)

- Count
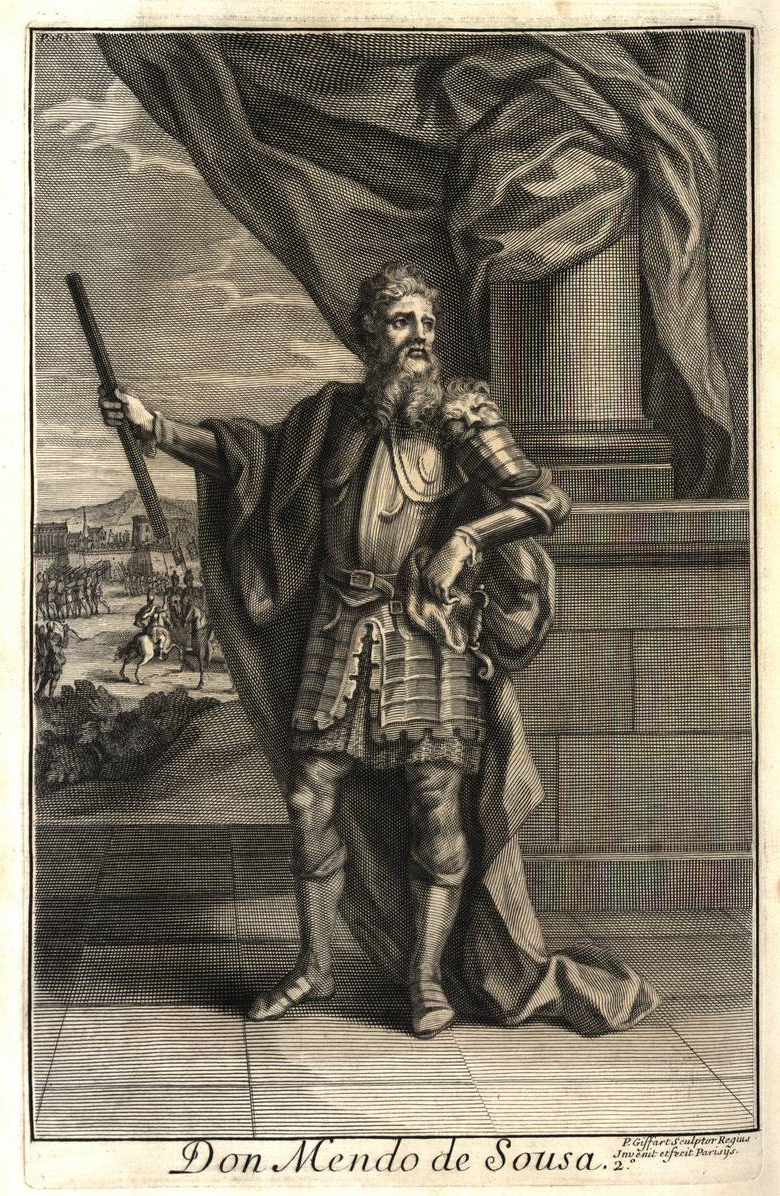

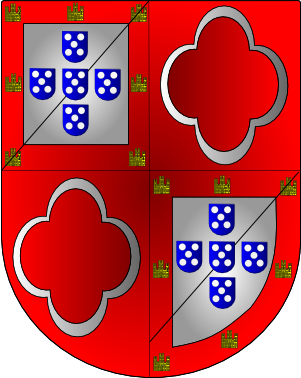
- Coat of arms
- Predecessor: Gonçalo Mendes de Sousa
- Successor: Gonçalo Mendes II de Sousa
- Born: 12th Century; Portugal
- Died: 12th Century; Portugal
- Noble family: House of Sousa
- Spouse: Maria Rodrigues Veloso
- Issue: Gonçalo Mendes II de Sousa; Garcia Mendes II de Sousa; Vasco Mendes de Sousa; Rodrigo Mendes de Sousa; Urraca Mendes de Sousa; Henrique Mendes de Sousa; Martim Mendes Conde
- Father: Gonçalo Mendes de Sousa
- Mother: Urraca Sanches de Celanova

Mendo de Sousa (1120s–1192) was a Portuguese Count, Patron of the Monastery of Pombeiro and Mordomo-mór of Sancho I of Portugal.

== Biography ==
Born in Portugal, Mendo was the son of Gonçalo Mendes de Sousa and Urraca Sanches de Celanova, a noble woman, granddaughter of Henry, Count of Portugal and Theresa. He was a direct descendant of Sueiro Belfaguer, 1st Lord House of Sousa.

Mendo de Sousa married Maria Rodrigues Veloso, daughter of Count Rodrigo Velloso. They had six children:

- Gonçalo Mendes II de Sousa
- Garcia Mendes II de Sousa
- Vasco Mendes de Sousa
- Rodrigo Mendes de Sousa
- Urraca Mendes de Sousa
- Henrique Mendes de Sousa

Outside of marriage, Mendo had another son named Martim Mendes Conde.
