= Monastery of Santa Clara =

Coordinates: 41°21′09″N 8°44′21″W

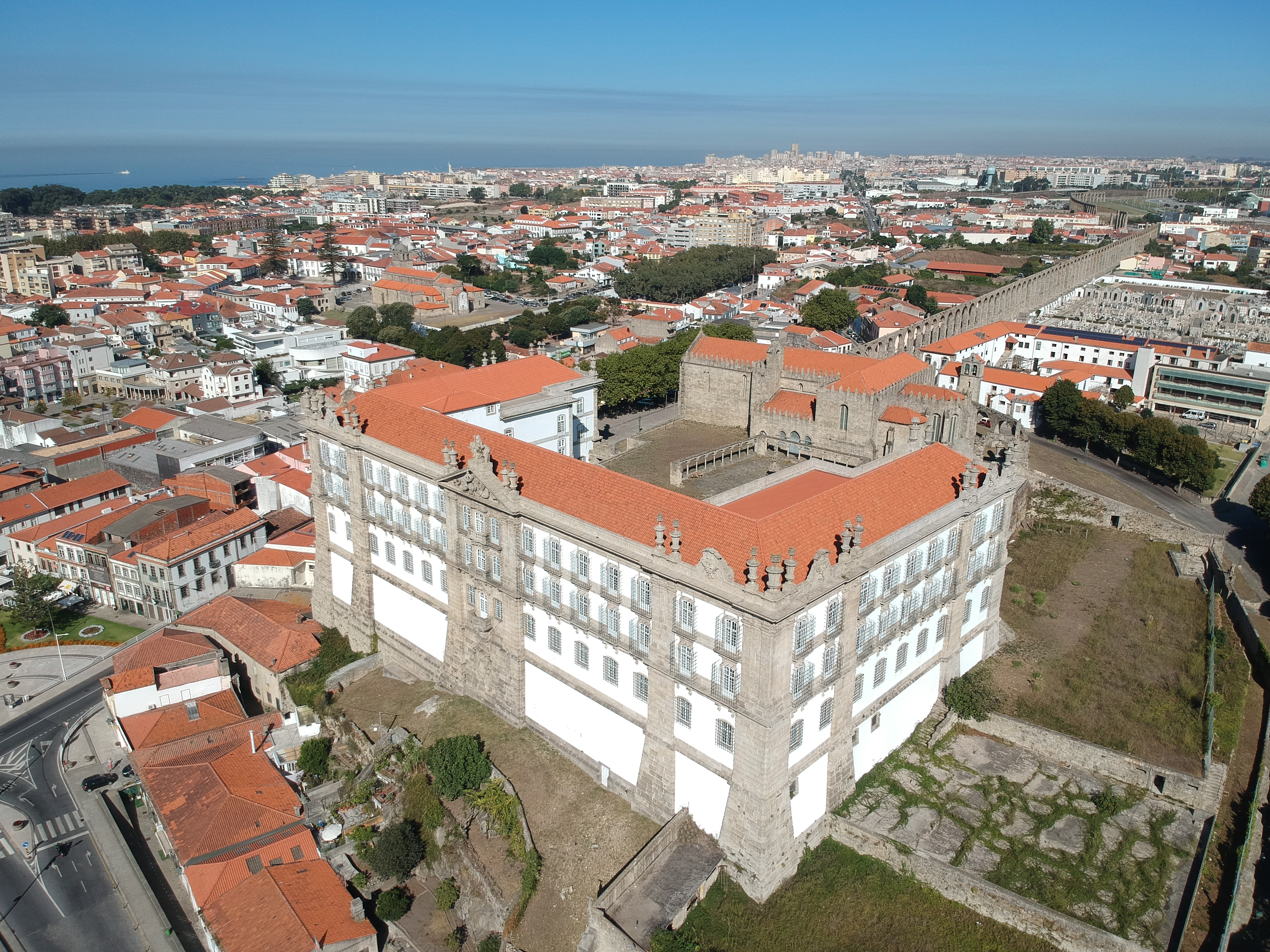
Convent of Santa Clara in Vila do Conde.

Monastery of Santa Clara or Convent of Santa Clara in Vila do Conde, Portugal was one of the biggest and richest feminine convents in Portugal, founded in 1318, by Afonso Sanches and his wife, Teresa Martins Telo.

The large historical complex includes the Gothic Santa Clara Church (1318), nearby Manueline late Gothic constructions and the current proper monastery, built in the early phase of the neoclassical style in 1777. The Monastery is located in a hilltop and includes large walls that protect the monastery from the east and the Santa Clara Aqueduct, the second largest aqueduct in Portugal. The monastery is considered a fundamental temple of the Portuguese Gothic architecture North of Douro river.

== History ==
The monastery's construction began in 1318 by Afonso Sanches, bastard son of King Denis of Portugal, and his wife, Teresa Martins Telo. It is thought that the Castle of the Counts of Cantanhede existed in there. In 1319, the founders donated the site to the Clarisses, who were responsible for the temple's architecture that remains to the present day.

The internal organization of the community was established in rulings by the founders, in which they donated several villas and hamlets in Póvoa de Varzim and farms in Touginha, Beiriz, Terroso, Formariz, Laundos, Navais, and Mirante, with an obligation that four chaplains would pray four masses per day honouring their founders and King Denis.

In the 15th and 16th centuries, several disputes arose, due to the monastery's wealth and jurisdictions. In 1514, King Manuel granted a new charter to Povoa de Varzim, in which the financial part of the ancient royal charter was changed and created new mechanisms for the jurisdiction of the monastery. In 1516, Vila do Conde was also granted a royal charter. In 1517, the convent was reformed by the friar Francisco Lisboa, nominated by papal bull in 1515, according to requests by king Manuel I. The Abbess Joana de Meneses resisted and was obliged to move to another convent, and nuns from the Nossa Senhora da Conceição convent in Beja replaced them, including the new abbess, Isabel de Castro.

== Santa Clara Church ==
It is a very austere and monumental building that, partly, reminds other Poor Clare's architecture in other locations in Portugal, especially in the western façade, where the Rose window is the only element, which is sided by two buttresses. However, the interior of the building differs substantially, as it has a single nave.

Church of Santa Clara

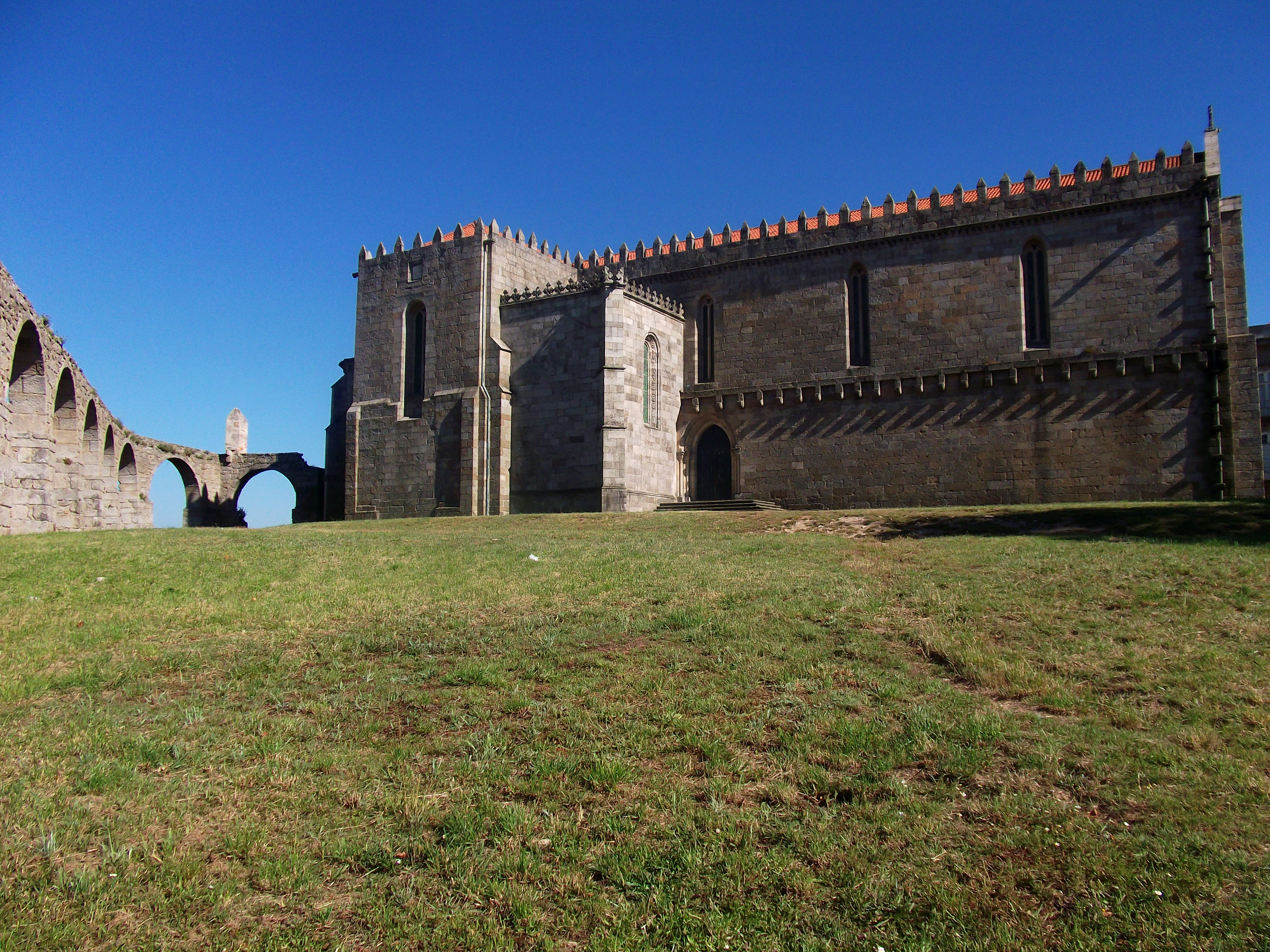
Endpoint of Santa Clara Aqueduct

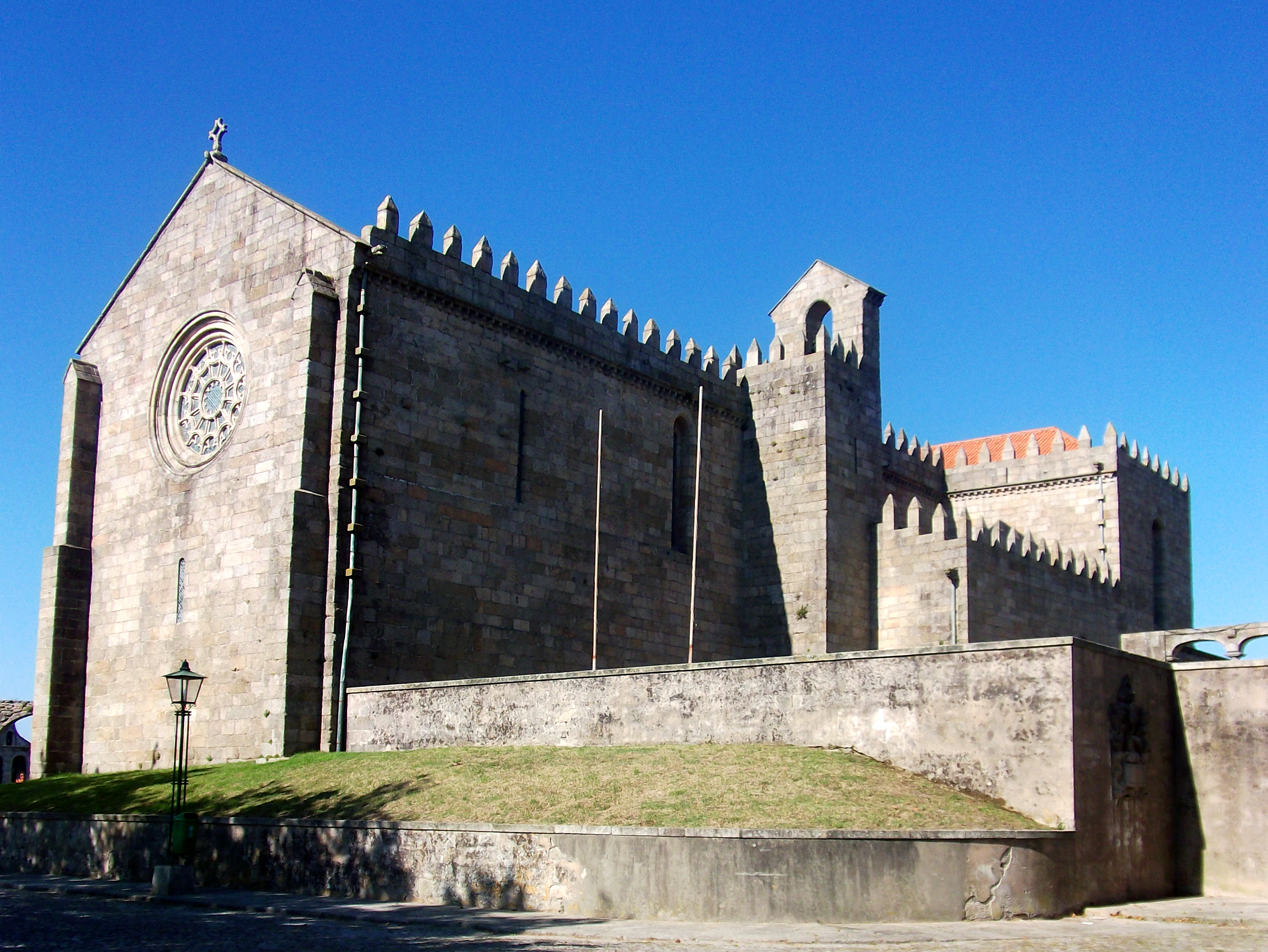
General view of the fortress-like Gothic church

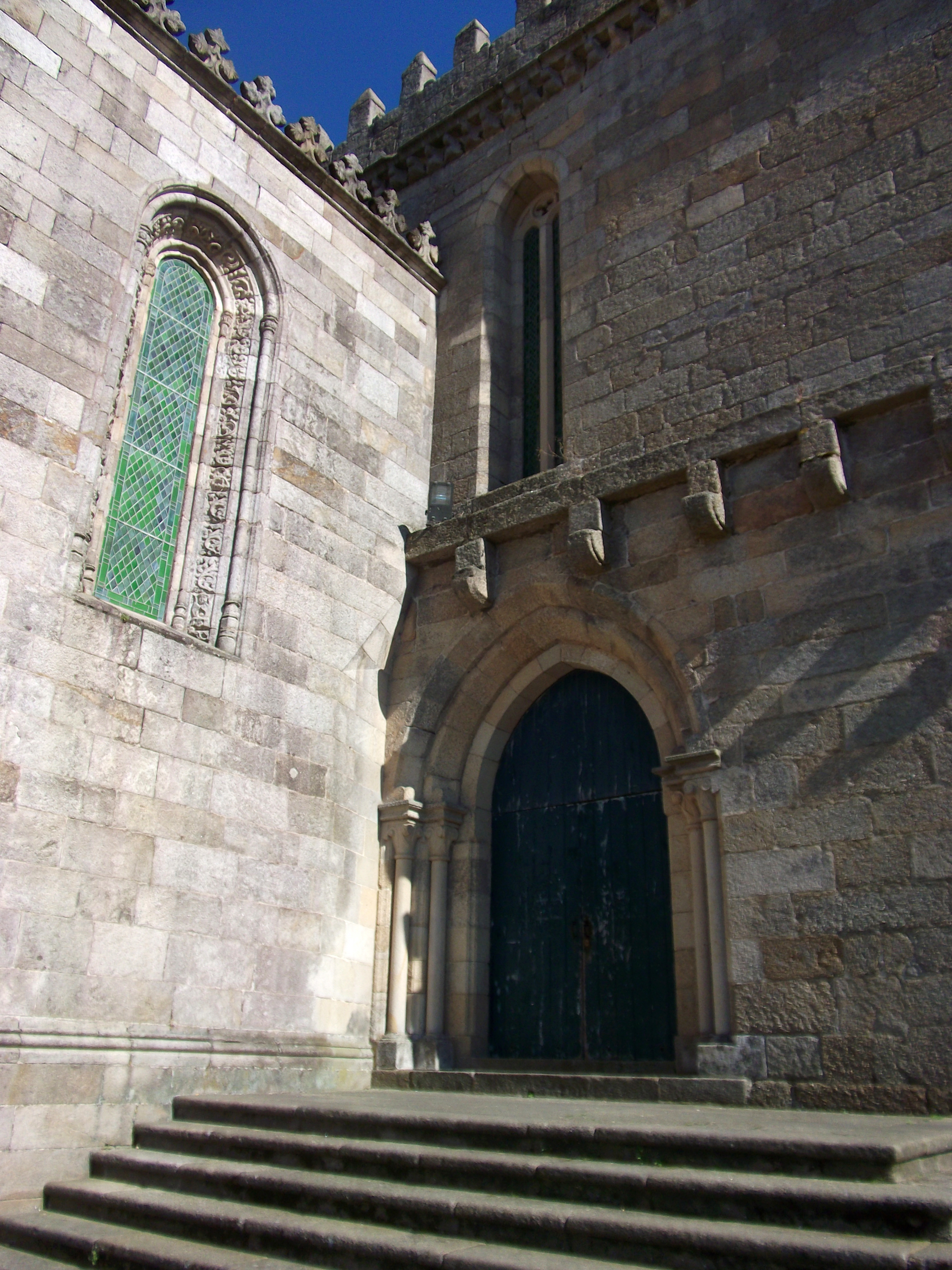
Gothic architecture details

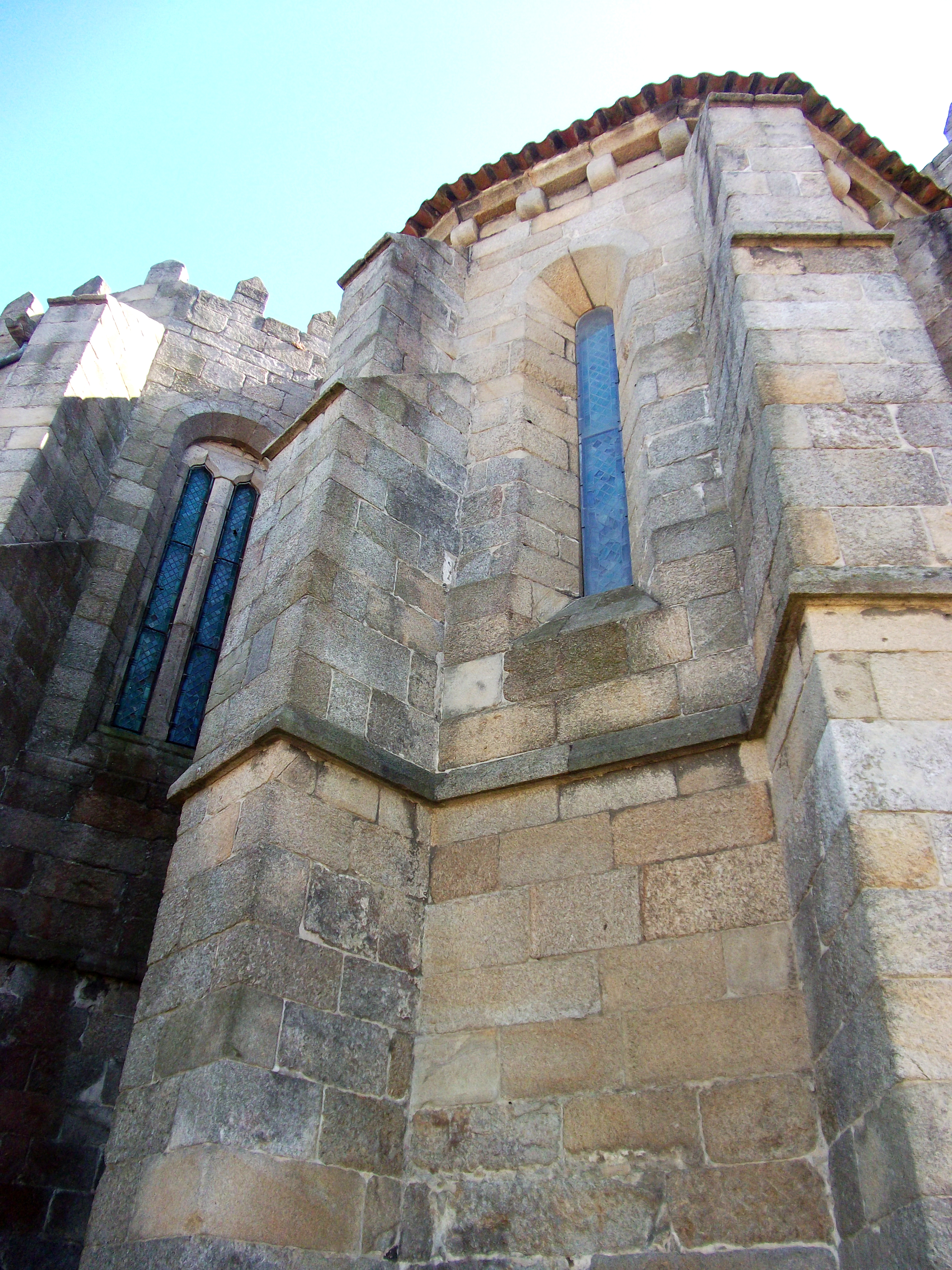
Another view of the church

== See also ==
- Monastery of Santa Clara-a-Velha

== Bibliography ==
- Sotto Mayor Pizarro, José Augusto P. (1987). Os Patronos do Mosteiro de Grijo: Evolução e Estrutura da Familia Nobre Séculos XI a XIV (in Portuguese). Oporto.
