= Egas Gomes de Sousa =

- Rico-Homen
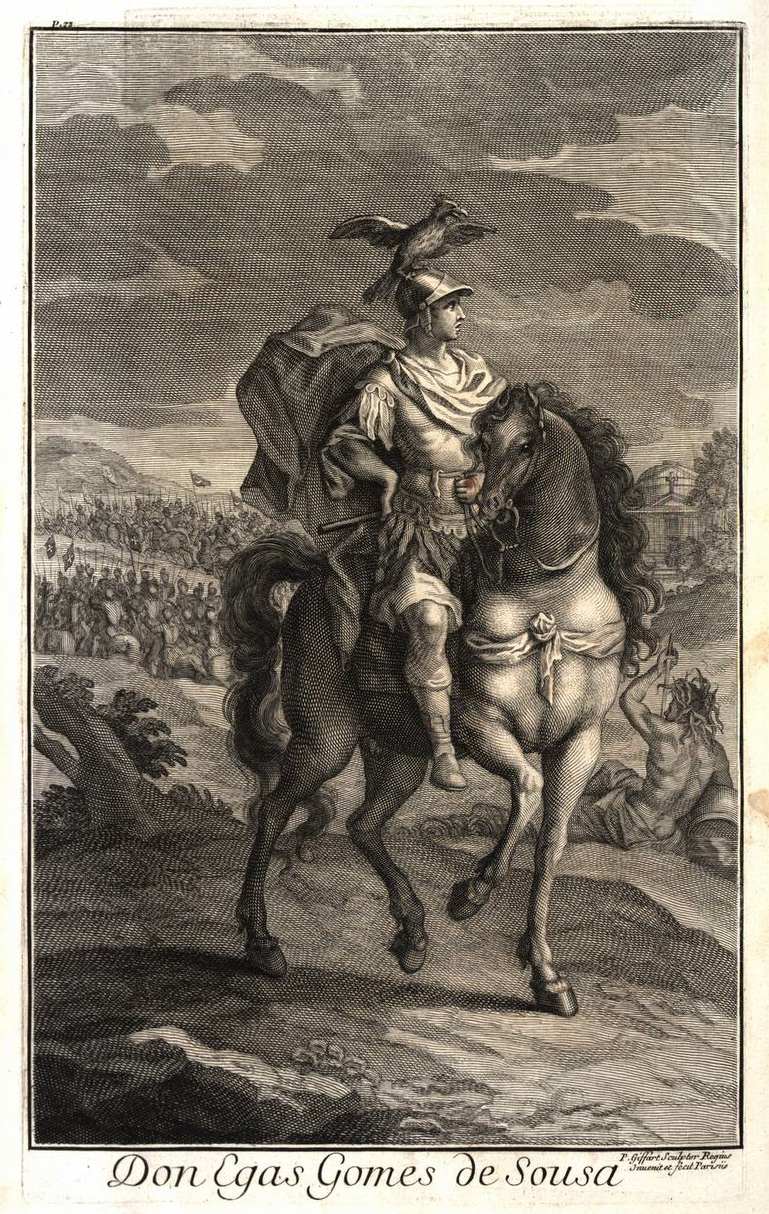

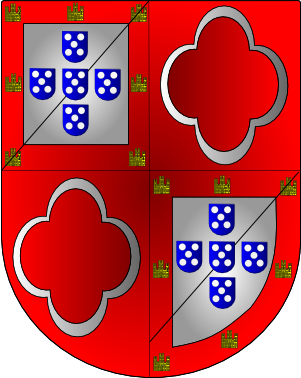
- Coat of arms
- Tenure: 1035-?
- Predecessor: Sueiro Belfaguer
- Successor: Mem Viegas de Sousa
- Born: County of Portugal
- Buried: Monastery of Santa Maria de Pombeiro
- Noble family: House of Sousa
- Spouse: Gontinha Gonçalves da Maia
- Issue: Mem Viegas de Sousa; Gomes Viegas; Paio Nunes de Sousa
- Father: Gomes Echigues
- Mother: Gontronde Moniz de Touro

Egas Gomes de Sousa (c. 1035 -?) was a Portuguese noble of the County of Portugal and the first of his line to use the surname Sousa. He was Lord of the House of Sousa and of Felgueiras.

== Biography ==
He served as governor of the entire region of Entre Douro e Minho. He was captain-general, and as such in combat he beat the King of Tunis in a battle near the town of Beja. He was buried in the Monastery of Pombeiro.

== Family ==
He was the son of Gomes Echigues and his 1st wife, Gontronde Moniz de Touro, daughter of Munio Moniz de Bierzo, Count of Bierzo and Muniadona Moniz. He married a member of the Maia family (probably Gontinha Gonçalves da Maia), although there are various versions as to her name and filiation. Egas had two sons:

- Mem Viegas de Sousa, married Teresa Fernandes de Marnel;
- Gomes Viegas
- Paio Nunes de Sousa
