= Echigues Goçoi =

Portuguese knight

Echigues Goçoy
- Medieval Knight
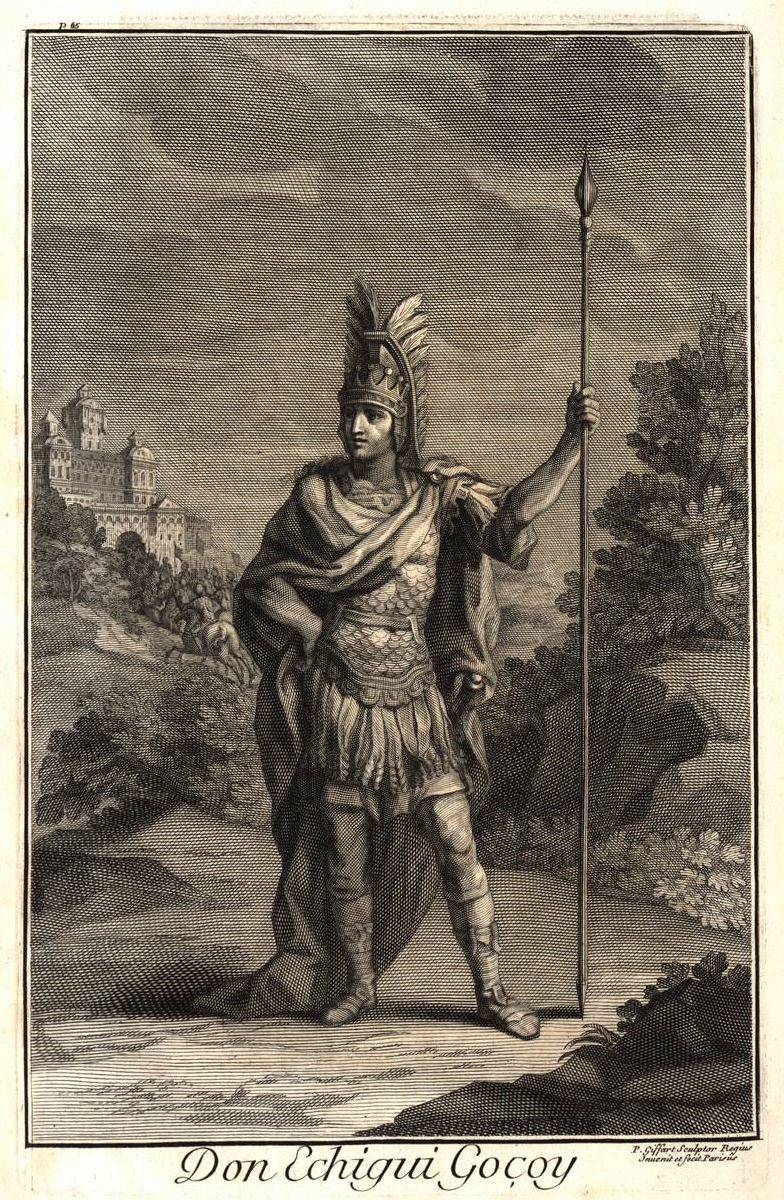
- Other names: Échiga Vizóiz, Echigues Goçoi, Echega Guiçoi
- Born: c.985 Iberian Peninsula
- Died: 1060; Iberian Peninsula
- Spouse: Aragunta Gonçalves da Maia
- Issue: Gomes Echigues
- Father: Vizoi Vizois
- Mother: Munia Goçoy

Echigues Goçoy or Échiga Vizóiz (c. 985–1060), was a medieval Knight of the County of Portugal.

== Family ==
Echigues Goçoy was a direct descendant of Sueiro Belfaguer. He was the son of Vizoi Vizois (950 –?) and Munia Goçoy.

Echigues married to Araguta Gonçalves da Maia (985-?), daughter of Suero de Novellas (count of Castille) and Mayor Diaz (descendant of Diego Rodríguez Porcelos) in the year 1000, with whom he had:

- Gomes Echigues (1010–1065) who married twice, first to Gontrode Moniz, daughter of Múnio Fernandez (1030-?) bastard son of Ferdinand I of León, and second to Goldregodo Sendines.
