= Sousa family =

Portuguese noble family

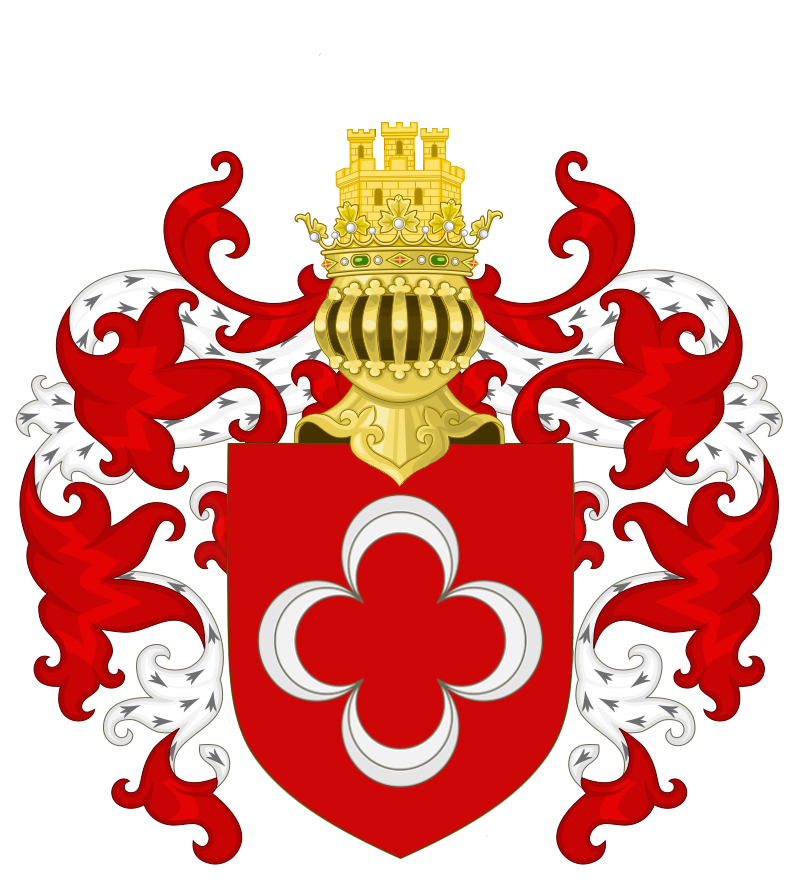
Ancient arms of the House of Sousa.

The House of Sousa (pt. Casa de Sousa) is an ancient Portuguese noble family which originated in the 9th century. It is considered to be one of the eldest and most noble houses in the Kingdom of Portugal.

== History ==
The Sousa family originated in the 9th century, when Portuguese nobleman D. Sueiro Belfauger founded the Sousa dynasty, being the first lord of the House of Sousa.

The lineage lasted for a few generations until the first use of the name Sousa as a surname, which was in the year 1035 a.D, when nobleman D. Egas Gomes de Sousa was born in Galicia, he was the captain-general and governor ("imperator") of the portuguese military province of Entre-Douro-e-Minho and a key figure in the Portuguese Reconquista. On one occasion, in a fierce battle near the city of Beja, he defeated the king of Tunis, a muslim military leader, and, in the victory, he captured many of the islamic banners which the muslim fighters were waving, which had crescents embrodied in them, this crescents were subsequently put in the family coat of arms, which consisted of four silver crescents on a dark red background.

After the reconquista, the House of Sousa played a crucial role in the establishment of the Portuguese Empire and the portuguese trading routes, which were mainly expanded throughout in Asia, Africa, America and Oceania. Furthermore, many descendants of the House of Sousa held very important civilian, military, religious and political titles in mainland Portugal and its colonies, one example of this were Martim Afonso de Sousa, who was the first donatary of the Capitancy of São Vicente and governor of Portuguese India, and Tomé de Sousa, who was the first governor-general of Brazil and personally founded the city of Salvador da Bahía, also, Pedro Lopes de Sousa was the 1st Governor of Portuguese Ceylon and Thome de Sousa-Arronches was a Captain of the Portuguese Navy in the Portuguese India Armadas.

Throughout the following centuries, the House of Sousa continued to play important roles in the development and defence of Portugal and its colonies up until the republican revolution on the 5th October 1910, when the monarchy and all institutions and ranks of nobility ceased to exist in Portugal.

The family motto is "Deus Connosco" (God is with us).

Lords (Senhores) of the House of Sousa

- D. Sueiro Belfaguer (875-925) - the 1st Lord of the House of Sousa.
- D. Hugo Soares Belfaguer (880-950)
- D. Ahufo Ahufes (925-?)
- D. Vizoi Vizois (950-?)
- D. Echigues Goçoi (c. 985-1060)
- D. Gomes Echigues (c. 1010–1065)
- D. Egas Gomes de Sousa (1035 -?)
- D. Mem Viegas de Sousa (1070 - 1130)
- D. Gonçalo Mendes de Sousa, "the good" (1120 – 1190)
- D. Mendo de Sousa, "the sousão" (1140 -1197)
- D. Constança Mendes de Sousa (1245 - Santarém, 1298)
- D. Martim Afonso Chichorro (1250-1313)
- D. Martim Afonso Chichorro II or Martin Afonso de Sousa Chichorro (1280 -?)
- D. Maria Pais Ribeira, 15ª Lady of House of Sousa * c. 1285
- D. Vasco Martins de Sousa Chichorro (1320 - 1387)
- D. Lopo Dias de Sousa, Lord of Mafra, Ericeira and Enxara dos Cavaleiros * 1350
- D. Afonso Vasques de Sousa (1370)
- Diogo Lopes de Sousa, 18º Lord of House of Sousa * c. 1380
- D.Afonso Vasques de Sousa II (1400),
- Álvaro de Sousa, Lord of Miranda e mayor of Arronches * c. 1410
- D. Luis de Sousa Chichorro (1440)
- Diogo Lopes de Sousa * c. 1440
- André de Sousa * c. 1465
- D. Henrique de Sousa (1480)
- Manuel de Sousa, mayor of Arronches * c. 1495
- André de Sousa, 23º Lord of House of Sousa * c. 1515
- D. António de Sousa Chichorro (1520)
- Manuel de Sousa
- D. Matias de Sousa (1550)
- Diogo Lopes de Sousa, 2nd Count of Miranda * c. 1595
- D. Pedro de Sousa Chichorro
- Henrique de Sousa Tavares, first Marquis of Arronches * 1626
- D. Maria de Sousa e Mesquita
- D. António Sousa Chíchorro balio "ad honorem".
- Mariana Luísa Francisca de Sousa Tavares Mascarenhas e Silva, 2nd Marquess of Arronches * 1672
- Luísa Casimira de Sousa Nassau and Ligne, duchess of Lafões * 1694

== Coat of arms ==
The first instance of the ancient coat of arms of the House of Sousa comes from the 11th century, when the victory of D. Egas Gomes de Sousa and his armies against the muslim king of Tunis earned him the coat of arms which included four silver crescents over a field of red. Over time, the coat of arms varied between the three different branches of the family, and, in the 16th century, started being depicted in four quarters (quarterly or party per cross) with the royal arms of Portugal in the first and fourth quarters, and the arms of Sousa, a quartet of silver crescents (Argent) over a field of red (Gules), in the second and third quarters. This grouping known as the Sousa of Arronches (because of the title of Lords of Arronches), is still borne by many of the noble houses of Portugal, like the Dukes of Palmela.
