= João Afonso de Albuquerque =

Lord of Alburquerque and of Meneses from 1304 to 1354

- Lord of Alburquerque and of Meneses
- Born: 1304; Lisbon, Kingdom of Portugal
- Died: 28 September 1354 (aged 49–50); Medina del Campo, Kingdom of Castile, Crown of Castile
- Buried: Monastery of la Santa Espina in Castromonte (Valladolid)
- Noble family: Téllez de Meneses
- Spouse: Isabel Téllez de Meneses
- Father: Afonso Sanches
- Mother: Teresa Martins de Meneses

João Afonso de Albuquerque, (c. 1304 – 28 September 1354), Juan Alfonso de Alburquerque in Spanish and nicknamed "o do Ataúde", (Note: In his will, he asked not to be buried immediately but that his coffin (ataúde) should be carried by his vassals until King Peter ceased to persecute his kinsmen, hence his nickname.) 6th Lord of Alburquerque, was a member of the highest ranks of the nobility of the Kingdom of Portugal, an astute politician, and descendant from the royal houses of both Portugal and Castile, although through illegitimate lines.

Count of Alburquerque, Lord of Azagala, Codosera, Alconchel, Medellín, Meneses and Tiedra, he was the Alférez of King Alfonso XI of Castile and Leon (1333 – 1336), Chancellor of Castile between 1350 and 1353, and Mayordomo mayor of Infante Peter, later King Peter I of Castile, who is suspected of having him poisoned in 1354.

== Family origins and early years ==
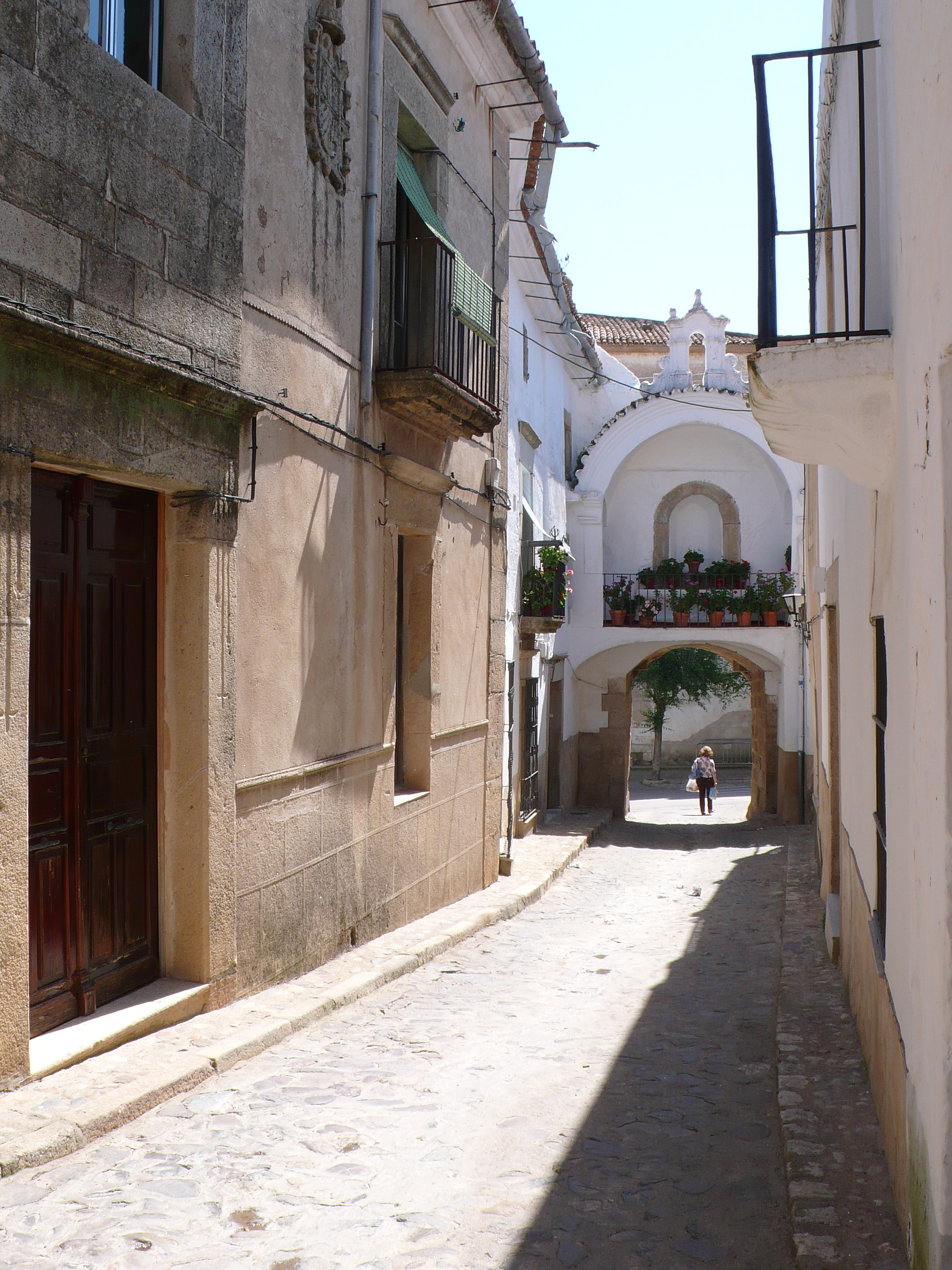
Gate in the town of Alburquerque

His father, Afonso Sanches, was the firstborn and favorite son of King Denis I of Portugal who had him out of wedlock with Aldonza Rodrigues Telha. Teresa Martins de Meneses, his mother, was the daughter of João Afonso Telo, the first count of Barcelos, (Note: In his will dated 5 May 1304 in Lisbon, the Count of Barcelos asked the king to ensure that his eldest daughter, Teresa Martins, inherited the Castle of Alburquerque upon his death.) and of Teresa Sánchez, an illegitimate daughter of Sancho IV the Brave, king of Castile and León. Teresa survived her husband by almost twenty years.

João Afonso de Albuquerque was raised in Lisbon at the house of João Simão de Urrô who in 1314 gave him certain properties in the city and in Alenquer.

== Favorite of Peter the Cruel ==
Already settled in Castile by around 1330 he appears often in charters confirming as the alférez of his cousin Alfonso XI and also as the tutor (ayo) and later mayordomo of Infante Pedro, who was barely fifteen years old when his father died, forming a close relationship with the young king as his favorite and one of the most influential politicians in the kingdom. He was also the chancellor of King Alfonso XI and during part of the reign of his son Peter I.

When the session of the Cortes de Valladolid of 1351 were convened, he was at the height of his power and had great influence on the decisions that were taken. Measures were passed to protect trade with Flanders, to organize the prosecution of wrongdoers, an attempt to normalize the precarious economic situation by controlling prices and wages, and to prepare a census of the Behetrías (communities with the right to choose their own lord) which resulted in the drafting of the Becerro de las Behetrías de Castilla, a detailed account of these communities and of their respective lords.

He also played a key role in arranging the marriage of young King Peter I with Blanche, daughter of Peter I, Duke of Bourbon, with the aim bolstering the relationship between the kingdoms of Castile and France and was the best man at the wedding ceremony on 3 June 1353 at the Collegiate Church of Santa María la Mayor in Valladolid.

== Fall from grace and death ==
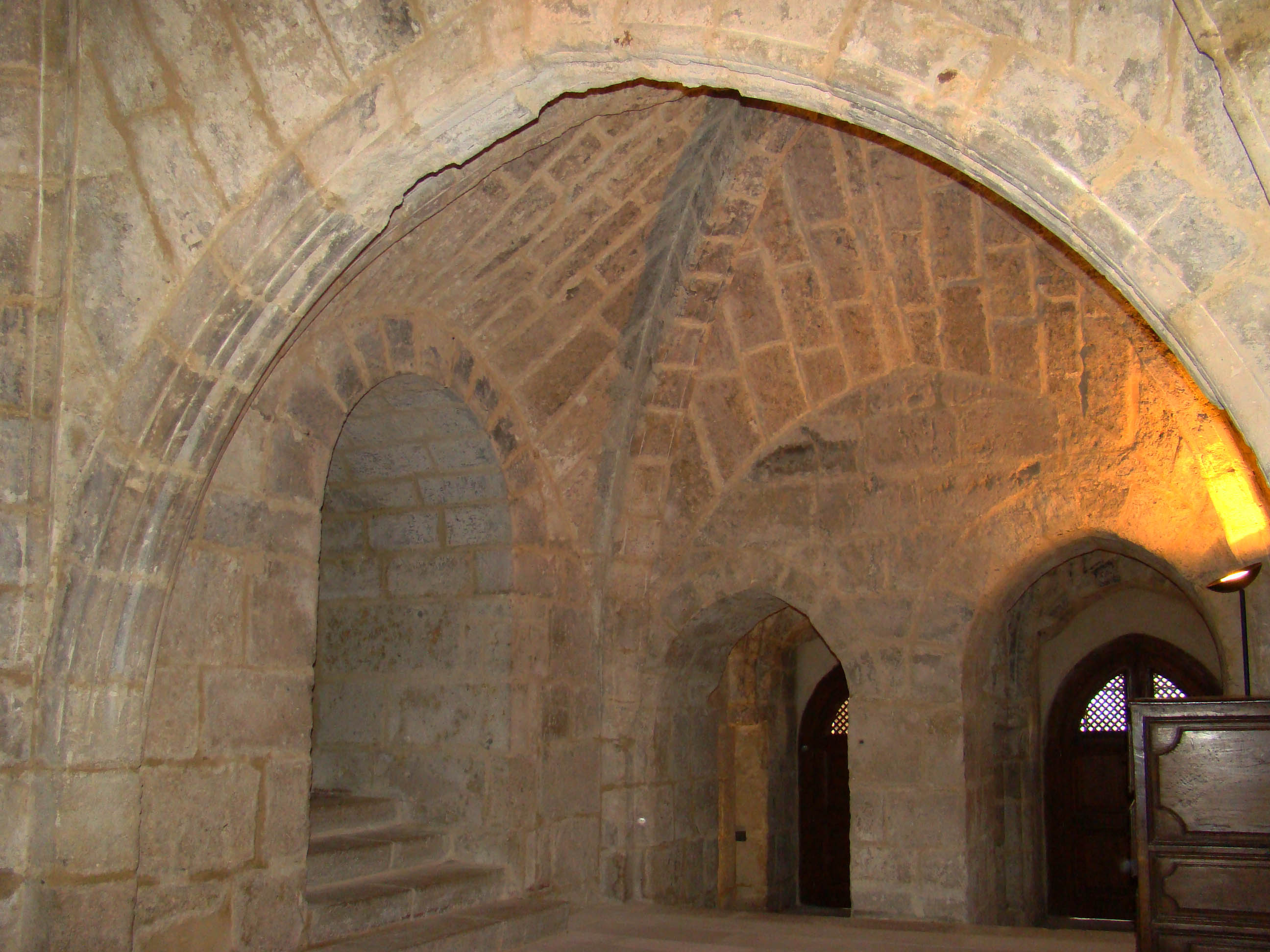
Monastery of Santa María de la Santa Espina in Castromonte where Juan Alfonso de Alburquerque was buried.

Albuquerque's policies, favorable to an alliance with France, together with his excessive influence in the affairs of the court, eventually distanced him from the king, who began to consider an approach to England. Fearing the royal ire, Albuquerque retired to his properties in Extremadura and then returned to Portugal. King Peter replaced the men who had been closest to Alburquerque with the kinsmen and friends of his mistress María de Padilla.

It was during this time that he reached an agreement with the future King Henry II of Castile, who had formed a coalition with other noblemen to fight against his half-brother King Peter I. According to the Chronicle of Pero López de Ayala, "he met with Don Enrique and with the Grand Master of the Order of Santiago Fadrique, and the three of them reached an agreement", after which they went to Alburquerque, ravaged the lands of Badajoz and occupied Ciudad Rodrigo.

A few days after the successful occupation of Medina del Campo by the rebels, João Afonso de Albuquerque died suddenly in that city in 1354, most probably poisoned, according to Pero López de Ayala, by a physician, following the orders of King Peter I, who gave him a poisonous potion.

== Burial ==
After his death, the King's rivals carried his coffin throughout the kingdom and they did not bury him until King Peter I was defeated. His final resting place was the Monastery of Santa María de la Santa Espina in the province of Valladolid where his wife and their only son were subsequently buried.

== Marriage and issue ==
Between 1323 and 1324, he married his cousin Isabel Téllez de Meneses, the tenth Lady of Meneses, and daughter of Tello Alfonso de Meneses and Maria of Portugal, granddaughter of Afonso III of Portugal.

One son was born of this marriage:

- Martin Gil de Alburquerque (c. 1325 – 1365) became lord of Alburquerque at the death of his father and was the adelantado of Murcia. He was executed by order of Peter the Cruel in 1365 and buried at the same monastery as his parents. His death marked the end of the principal line of this lineage; his estates were seized by Peter and added to the crown lands.

João Afonso de Albuquerque had several children out of wedlock with Maria Rodrigues Barba, daughter of Rui Martins Barba and Iria Martins Alardo:

- Fernando Afonso de Albuquerque (c. 1327 – 1387). Lord of Vila Nova de Anços and Master of the Order of Santiago, with illegitimate issue.
- Beatriz Afonso de Albuquerque, the wife of João Afonso Telo, brother of Queen Leonor Teles, 6th Count of Barcelos and Admiral of Portugal, who died in the Battle of Aljubarrota.
- Maria Afonso de Albuquerque, the wife of Gonçalo Teles de Meneses, first Count of Neiva and Lord of Faria and brother of the husband of her sister Beatriz.

He had another son with María Gil:

- Pedro Gil de Alburquerque. (Note: "Decree issued by John II of Portugal legitimizing Pedro Gil de Alburquerque, son of João Afonso de Alburquerque and María Gil, grandson of Afonso Sanches". Salazar y Castro Collection, Spanish Royal Academy of History, Ref. D-16, f. 85.)

== Bibliography ==
- Arco y Garay, Ricardo del (1954). Sepulcros de la Casa Real de Castilla (in Spanish). Madrid: Instituto Jerónimo Zurita. Consejo Superior de Investigaciones Científicas. OCLC 11366237.
- Costa, Marisa (2004). "Poder e autoridade de fundar um mosteiro" (PDF). De arte: Work de la historia del arte (in Portuguese) (4): 23–38. ISSN 1696-0319.
- Díaz Martín, Luis Vicente (1992). "Pedro I y los primeros Trastámaras". Historia General de España y América (in Spanish). Vol. V. Madrid: Rialp. ISBN 84-321-2119-3.
- Fernandes, Fátima Regina (1972). "A extinção da descendência varonil dos Menezes de Albuquerque em Castela e suas implicações na administração do seu património em Portugal" (PDF). Revista da Faculdade de Letras, História, Universidade do Porto. Série I (in Portuguese) (1): 1453–1467. ISSN 0871-164X.
- López de Ayala, Pedro (1780). Crónica de los Reyes de Castilla, Don Pedro, Don Enrique II, Don Juan I, Don Enrique III (in Spanish). Madrid: Imprenta de D. Antonio de Sancha. OCLC 2921347.
- Reglero de la Fuente, Carlos Manuel (2001). "Señores y vasallos en una aldea castellana medieval: Fuenteungrillo (siglos XIII-XIV)" (PDF). Edad Media: Revista de historia (in Spanish) (4): 113–139. ISSN 1138-9621.
- Sotto Mayor Pizarro, José Augusto (1997). Linhagens Medievais Portuguesas: Genealogias e Estratégias (1279-1325) (in Portuguese). Oporto: Thesis, published by author. hdl:10216/18023.
- Sotto Mayor Pizarro, José Augusto P. (1987). Os Patronos do Mosteiro de Grijo: Evolução e Estrutura da Familia Nobre Séculos XI a XIV (in Portuguese). Oporto.
- Valdeón Baruque, Julio (2002). Pedro I el Cruel y Enrique de Trastámara (in Spanish). Madrid: Santillana Ediciones Generales, S.L. ISBN 84-03-09331-4.
