= Afonso Sanches =

Portuguese nobleman

- Lord of Albuquerque
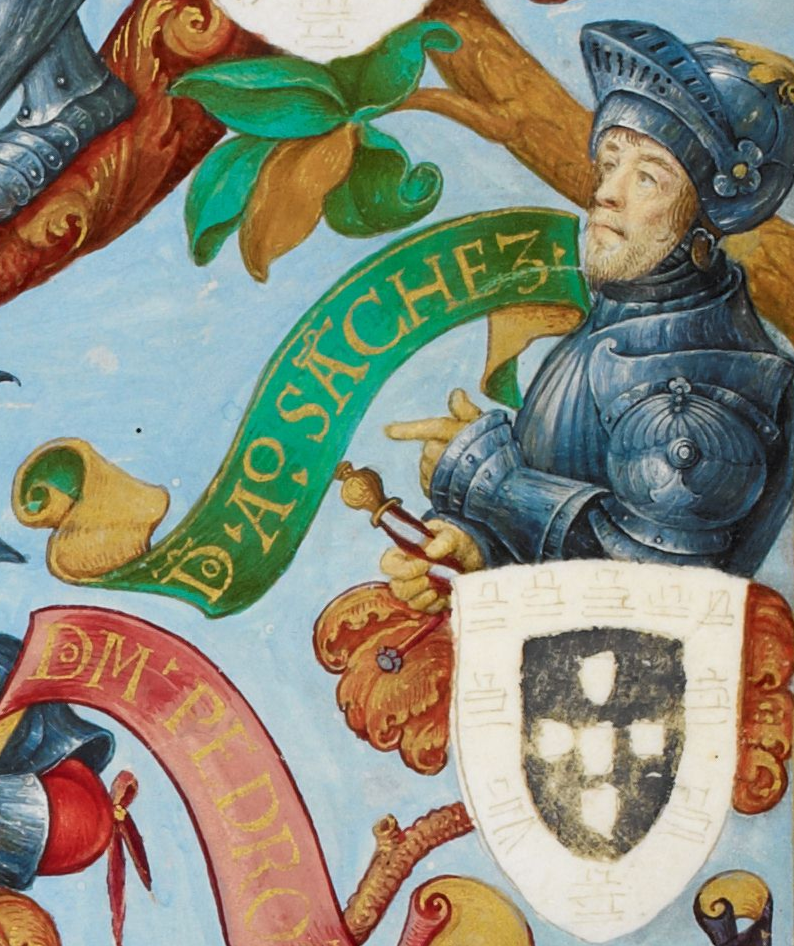
- Afonso Sanches in Antonio de Hollanda's Genealogy of the Royal Houses of Spain and Portugal (1530–1534)
- Born: 24 May 1289; Entre Douro e Minho, Portugal
- Died: 2 November 1329 (aged 40); Escalona, Castile
- Buried: Monastery of Santa Clara in Vila do Conde
- Noble family: House of Burgundy
- Spouse: Teresa Martins Telo
- Issue: João Afonso de Albuquerque
- Father: Denis of Portugal
- Mother: Aldonça Rodrigues Talha

Afonso Sanches, Lord of Albuquerque (24 May 1289 – 2 November 1329), also known as Alfonso Sanches, was a Portuguese nobleman, Lord of Cerva and Alburquerque.

== Biography ==
Born in Portugal, he was the second and favorite son of King Denis of Portugal. His mother was Aldonça Rodrigues Talha. He was also half brother of King Afonso IV. Afonso was married to Teresa Martins Telo, daughter of João Afonso Telo, the first count of Barcelos, and of Teresa Sánchez, an illegitimate daughter of Sancho IV the Brave, king of Castile and León. They were the parents of João Afonso de Albuquerque.

Afonso and his wife Teresa were the founders of the Monastery of Santa Clara in Vila do Conde where both were buried.

The Catholic Church opened a cause for the beatification of Afonso and Teresa on 17 January 1723, and the two were formally declared Servants of God.

== Bibliography ==
- Braamcamp Freire, Anselmo (1927). Brasões da Sala de Sintra, Livro Segundo (in Portuguese). Coimbra: Imprenta da Universidade. OCLC 794223590.
- Sotto Mayor Pizarro, José Augusto (1997). Linhagens Medievais Portuguesas: Genealogias e Estratégias (1279-1325) (in Portuguese). Oporto: Thesis, published by author. hdl:10216/18023.
- Sotto Mayor Pizarro, José Augusto P. (1987). Os Patronos do Mosteiro de Grijo: Evolução e Estrutura da Familia Nobre Séculos XI a XIV (in Portuguese). Oporto.
