= Gomes Echigues =

Portuguese politician (c. 1010–1065)

- Lord
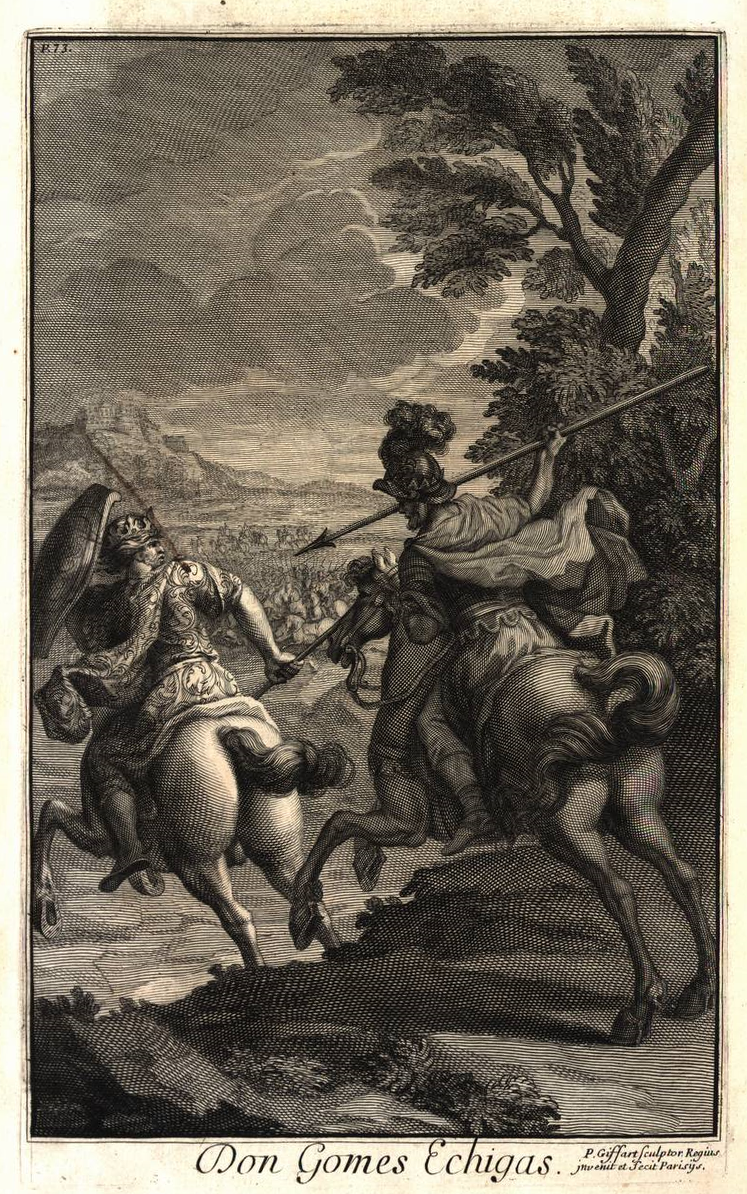
- Born: c. 1010; Iberian Peninsula
- Died: 1065; Iberian Peninsula
- Issue: Egas Gomes de Sousa
- Father: Echigues Goçoi

Gomes Echigues (c. 1010–1065) was a medieval Knight, Governor of the District of Entre-Douro-e-Minho and Lord of Felgueiras.

Gomes was the son of Echega Guiçoi and Aragunta Soares, maternal granddaughter of Diego Rodríguez Porcelos. His wife was Gontrode Moniz, daughter of Mono Fernandes de Touro.
