= Sancho Nunes de Barbosa =

Galician noble (1070–1130)

- Lord of Celanova
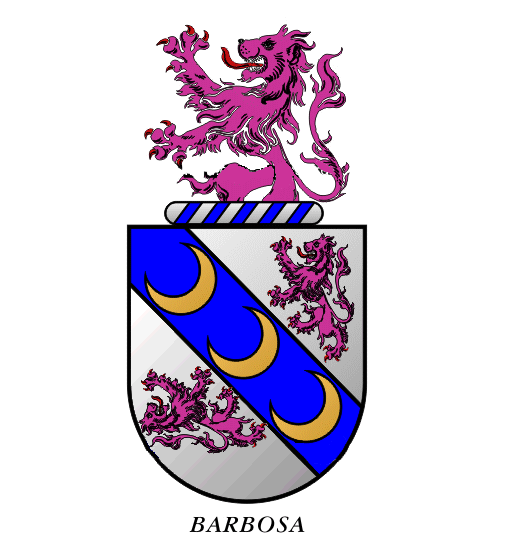
- Born: 1070; Celanova, Galicia
- Died: 1130 (aged 59–60); Celanova, Galicia

Sancho Nunes de Barbosa nicknamed Barbosa, Lord of Celanova (1070–1130) was a Galician nobleman.

He was the son of Nuño Velázquez, Count of Celanova, and Sancha Gomes. Sancho was married to Sancha Henriques, daughter of Henry, Count of Portugal. However, some sources state that his wife was Teresa Afonso, possible daughter of Afonso I of Portugal.

With Sancha Henriques he had the following issue: (Note: Historian Enriqueta López Morán adds other children that are not mentioned in Portuguese or primary sources. The alleged children are: Maria Sanches, abbess of the monastery of San Salvador de Sobrado de Trives, from December 1175 to April 1189; Gil Sanches; Fernando Sanches and Teresa Sanches. However, in the document mentioned by López Morán, Maria Sanches identifies herself as Sancho Nunes' relative not his daughter.)

- Urraca Sanches, married Gonçalo Mendes de Sousa «o Bom»;
- Vasco Sanches, married firstly Berengária and secondly Urraca Viegas de Ribadouro;
- Fruilhe Sanches, married Pedro Fernandes de Bragança;
- Nuno Sanches, married Teresa Álvares de Soverosa.
