= Monastery of Santa Maria de Pombeiro =

- Monastery of the Blessed Virgin Mary
- Mosteiro de Santa Maria
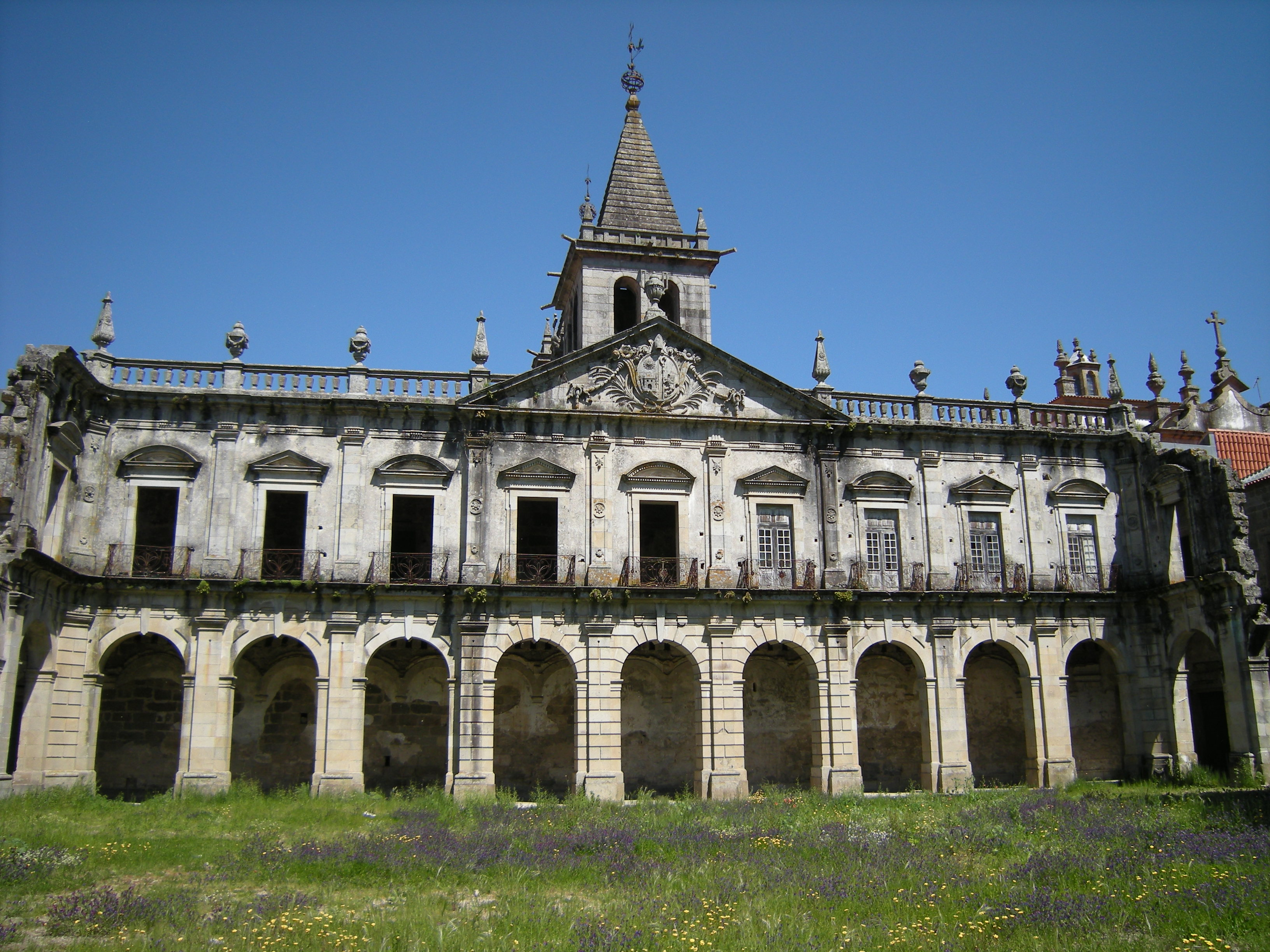
- Monastery of Santa Maria de Pombeiro
- 41°22′57.16″N 8°13′31.69″W
- Location: Porto, Tâmega, Norte
- Country: Portugal

History
- Dedication: Blessed Virgin Mary

Architecture
- Architect: Jerónimo Luís
- Style: Romanesque

Specifications
- Length: 115.67 m (379.5 ft)
- Width: 74.18 m (243.4 ft)

Administration
- Diocese: Private

The Monastery of Santa Maria de Pombeiro (Portuguese: Mosteiro de Santa Maria de Pombeiro), shortened to Monastery of Pombeiro, is a monastery in the civil parish of Pombeiro de Ribavizela, in the municipality of Felgueiras (district in Porto), in the northern region of Portugal.

== History ==
The first reference to a monastery or religious institution came from a papal brief to Pope Leo IV (in 853). Its founding would not occur until 13 July 1059 by Dom Gomes Aciegas, and completed 1102; the remains of this original construction are two small chapels (below the main altar), the mail entrance door and the four fortified arches. It is still unclear on the precise period that monastery and church was founded. Ferdinand I of Castile granted the proprietorship of the convent to his nephew D. Gomes de Cela Nova (progenitor of the Sousa family). From the Sousas, the monastery passed to the Melos and Sampaios (later under the protection of the Barbosa clan until the 11th century), represented by the Baron of Pombeiro de Ribavizela. At the time the abbot of Pombeiro functioned as the head almoner for the Kingdom, when the King travelled north of the Douro and ombudsman of the Count of Pombeiro.

In 1112, under Queen Teresa, the monastery was off-limits to most of its citizens, including the church. Afonso I of Portugal provided privileges and patronage in 1155 to the monastery and its prelate Gonçalo de Sousa. The abbot (Gonçalo de Sousa) would initiate remodelling and renovations in 1199. The monastery continued to be favoured by the monarchy, and throughout the 12th century a number of reliquaries were deposited in the altars of the Church.

In 1234, the monastery traded lands with the Monastery of São Miguel de Refojos de Basto, in Cabeceiras de Basto. During this time, new renovations were made to the eastern portico and rose-window, with assistance from the patronage of the Sousa family, who also selected the porch for their burial tombs: on 10 March 1242, Vasco Mendes de Sousa (son of Conde Mendo de Sousa and Maria Rodrigues) was buried in this tomb.

By 1272, a second generation of public works were completed in the Church façade, under the direction of D. Rodrigo.

In the second half of the 16th century, the abbot António de Mello order the execution of improvements to the church.

By 1578, the monastery's porch continued to exist, but now badly damaged, and as friar João de S. Tomás later noted: "there were, by order, coats-or-arms erected to identify the anciente nobility there buried, that there would serve as judge". On 6 March 1586, the monastery's rich patrimony was taken by King Philip I of Portugal and transferred to the Jerónimos Monastery. But, this did not limit the growth of the church and monastery, as major projects continued between the 16th and 18th century, with Jerónimo Luís being the principal contractor in 1600 constructing the two exterior towers.

One of the wings of the cloister were completed in 1702 (from descriptions made by Craesbeeck in 1725). It was followed in 1719 by the construction of the new choir in the principal wall, the displacement of the rose window from the portico to the bell towers. Continued remodelling in 1722 caused the destruction of the Romanesque main chapel in 1722.

The main organ was expanded in 1743, as a prelude to the execution of a new organ on 30 April 1767 by Francisco António Solha, which included gilding and the import of various mechanisms (at the total cost of 900$000 réis, not including 135$000 réis pipes. In successive years, the organ would be renovated: first in 1786, then 1801, before the pipes were stolen in the 20th century. Between 1770-1773, the retable was completed by friar José de Santo António Ferreira Vilaça, who also designed, the flourishments along the choir, the rosewood pews and the four chapels. Friar José later completed two lateral retables between 1774–1777, while two other retables were completed after him (1777–1780) by José Vilaça. Ironically, by 1785, the church and monastery was practically painted.

After the 19th century, the church and monastery were progressively falling into ruin, after the Benedictine monks were expelled in 1834, and a significant part of the altar and construction stone were removed to support other projects within the region.

Since 1910, the monastery has been considered a National Monument. In January 1997, the Ministry of Culture (Portuguese: Ministério da Cultura) purchases the building and one of the parcels around the monastery (the consisted of a house and three lots).

Throughout the Estado Novo regime the monastery was recovered in tiles, first beginning in 1958, then in 1960, 1961, 1962, 1963, 1969, which also included renovations to: the cupola, the lateral naves, the vaulted ceilings, and cloisters, in addition to the renovation of the bell-towers and sacristy (which was in fear of collapse). Similar public works were undertaken under the democratic governments after the Carnation Revolution. These repairs included projects to protect and renovate the damage caused by water drainage (1987), recuperation of the principal façades of the church and monastery, the high-choir, bell-towers and restoration of the first-floor oratory of the monastic residences, in addition to archaeological projects in 1997-1999.

== Architecture ==
The monastery and church of Santa Maria is located in a central part of the parish of Pombeiro de Ribavizela, implanted in a small, isolated valley characterized by small fields under cultivation or agricultural use. It is situated east of the main village of Pombeiro de Ribavizela, along Lugar do Mosteiro or the Estrada Municipal 1160.
