= Denis of Portugal =

King of Portugal from 1279 to 1325

Denis
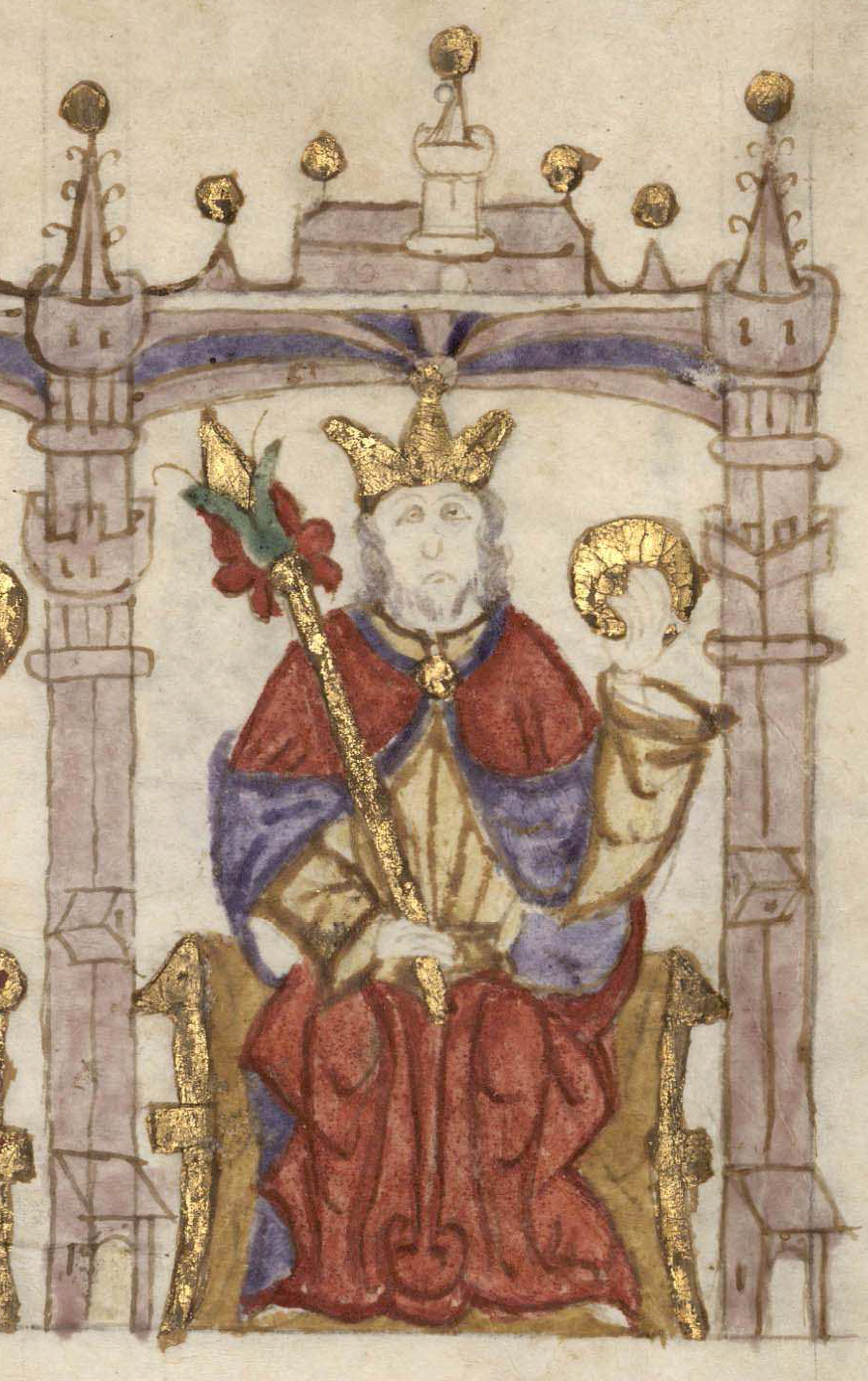
- King Denis in Compendium of Chronicles of Kings (...) (c. 1312–1325)

King of Portugal
- Reign: 16 February 1279 – 7 January 1325
- Predecessor: Afonso III
- Successor: Afonso IV
- Born: 9 October 1261; Lisbon, Portugal
- Died: 7 January 1325 (aged 63); Santarém, Portugal
- Burial: St. Denis Convent, Odivelas, Portugal
- Spouse: Elizabeth of Aragon (m. 1282)
- Issue Detail: Constance, Queen of Castile; Afonso IV, King of Portugal; Illegitimate: Pedro Afonso, Count of Barcelos; Afonso Sanches, Lord of Albuquerque; Maria Afonso
- House: Burgundy
- Father: Afonso III of Portugal
- Mother: Beatrice of Castile

Denis (Note: IPA: [ðiˈniʃ]) (Latin: Dionysius Alphonsus, Portuguese: Dinis Afonso; 9 October 1261 – 7 January 1325), called the Farmer King (Rei Lavrador) and the Poet King (Rei Poeta), was King of Portugal from 1279 until his death in 1325.

Denis was the eldest son of Afonso III of Portugal by his second wife, Beatrice of Castile, and grandson of Afonso II of Portugal. Denis succeeded his father in 1279. He was married to Elizabeth of Aragon, who was later canonised as a saint of the Roman Catholic Church.

Denis ruled Portugal for over 46 years. He worked to reorganise his country's economy and gave an impetus to Portuguese agriculture. He ordered the planting of a large pine forest (that still exists today) near Leiria to prevent soil degradation that threatened the region, and to serve as a source of raw materials for the construction of the royal ships. He was also known for his poetry, which constitutes an important contribution to the development of Portuguese as a literary language.

== Early life and background ==
Born on 9 October 1261 in Lisbon, Denis was the eldest son of Afonso III of Portugal and Beatrice of Castile, an illegitimate daughter of King Afonso X of Castile. Beatrice and Afonso were married c. 1253 to settle a dispute regarding the sovereignty of the Algarve. Afonso III agreed to temporarily abdicate his rights over the Algarve and lands east of Guadiana until his first-born son with Beatrice was seven. At the time of the wedding, Afonso was still married to Matilda II of Boulogne, who, in 1255, accused her husband before Pope Alexander IV of bigamy. In 1258, the Pope condemned Afonso III for adultery and placed him under interdict. Alexander IV's successor, Pope Urban IV, finally legitimized Denis and his siblings in 1263.

== Reign ==
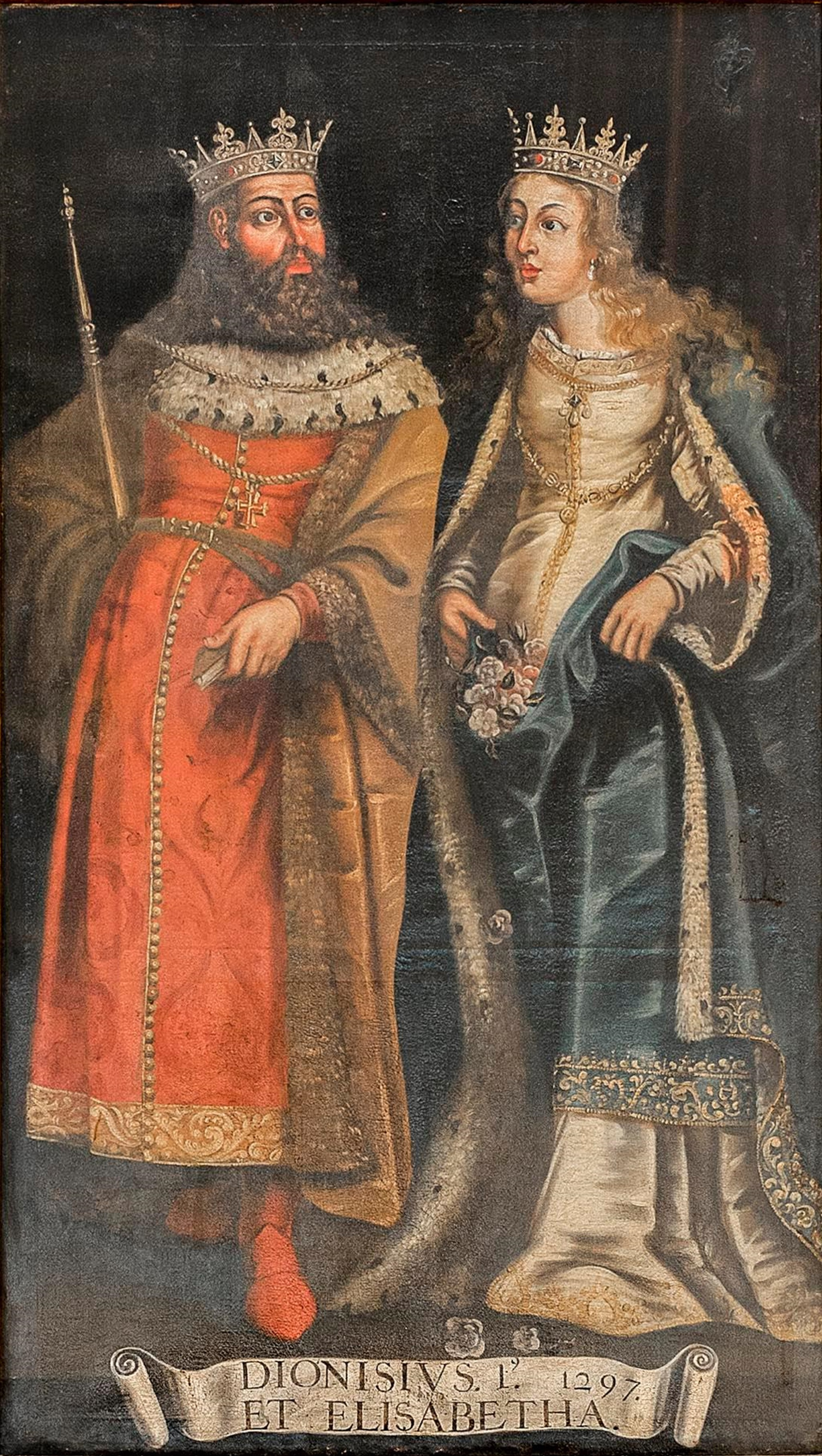
Portrait of King Denis and Queen Saint Elizabeth at Sala dos Capelos in the University of Coimbra

In 1290, Denis began to pursue the systematic centralisation of royal power by imposing judicial reforms, decreeing Portuguese "the official language of legal and judicial proceedings", creating the first university in Portugal, and ridding the military orders in the country of foreign influences. His policies encouraged economic development with the creation of numerous towns and trade fairs. He advanced the interests of the Portuguese merchants, and set up by mutual agreement a fund called the Bolsa de Comércio, the first documented form of marine insurance in Europe, approved on 10 May 1293. Always concerned with development of the country's infrastructure, he encouraged the discovery and exploitation of sulphur, silver, tin and iron mines and organised the export of excess production of agricultural crops, salt, and salted fish to England, Flanders, and France.

Denis signed the first Portuguese commercial agreement with England in 1308, and secured a contract in 1317 for the services of the Genoese merchant sailor Manuel Pessanha (Portuguese form of the Italian "Pezagno") as hereditary admiral of his fleet, with the understanding that Pessanha and his successors should provide twenty Genoese captains to command the king's galleys, thus effectively founding the Portuguese Navy.

In 1289 Denis had signed the Concordat of Forty Articles with Pope Nicholas IV, swearing to protect the Church's interests in Portugal. When Pope Clement V allowed the annihilation of the Knights Templar throughout most of Europe on charges of heresy, Denis created in 1319 a Portuguese military order, the Order of Christ, for those knights who survived the purge. The new order was designed to be a continuation of the Order of the Temple. Denis negotiated with Clement's successor, John XXII, for recognition of the new order and its right to inherit the Templar assets and property.

== Cultural pursuits ==
During Denis' reign, Lisbon became one of Europe's centres of culture and learning. The first university in Portugal, then called the Estudo Geral (General Study), was founded with his signing of the document Scientiae thesaurus mirabilis in Leiria on 3 March 1290. Lectures in the arts, civil law, canon law, and medicine were given, and on 15 February 1309, the king granted the university a charter, the Magna Charta Privilegiorum. The university was moved between Lisbon and Coimbra several times, and finally installed permanently in Coimbra in 1537 by order of King John III.

As a devotee of the arts and sciences, Denis studied literature and wrote several books on topics ranging from government administration to hunting, science and poetry, as well as ordering the translation of many literary works into Galician-Portuguese (Portuguese had not yet fully evolved into a distinct language), among them the works attributed to his grandfather Alfonso X. He patronised troubadours, and wrote lyric poetry in the troubadour tradition himself. His best-known work is the Cantigas de Amigo, a collection of love songs as well as satirical songs, which contributed to the development of troubador poetry in the Iberian Peninsula. All told, 137 of the songs attributed to him, in the three main genres of Galician-Portuguese lyric, are preserved in the two early 16th-century manuscripts, the Cancioneiro da Biblioteca Nacional and the Cancioneiro da Vaticana. A spectacular find in 1990 by American scholar Harvey Sharrer brought to light the Pergaminho Sharrer, which contains, albeit in fragmentary form, seven cantigas d'amor by King Denis with musical notation. These poems are found in the same order in the two previously known codices.

King Denis was fond of hunting and in 1294 was hunting around Beja, when a bear attacked him and his horse, bringing them to the ground. It is said that he attacked the beast single-handedly and killed him with a dagger. To commemorate the incident, the king had a live bear captured and taken to his palace of Fuellas for the amusement of the gentlemen and ladies of his court.

== Administration ==
Cross of the Order of Christ, a symbol that adorned, among others, the Portuguese caravels during the Age of Discoveries

As heir-apparent to the throne, Denis was summoned by his father Afonso III to share governmental responsibilities. The country was again in conflict with the Catholic Church at the time, Afonso having been excommunicated in 1277, and only being absolved in 1279 when he acceded to Rome's demands on his deathbed. Consequently, the church was favorably inclined to reach an agreement with the new monarch upon his accession to the throne.

In 1284, however, Denis emulated the example of his grandfather and father, and launched a new series of inquiries to investigate the expropriation of royal property; this was to the detriment of the church. The next year he took further steps against ecclesiastical power when he promulgated amortisation laws.These prohibited the church and religious orders from buying lands, and required that they sell or forfeit any they had purchased since the start of his reign. Several years later he issued another decree forbidding them to inherit the estates of recruits to the orders.

In 1288, Denis managed to persuade Pope Nicholas IV to issue a papal bull that separated the Order of Santiago in Portugal from that in Castile, to which it had been subordinate. With the extinction of the Knights Templar, he was able to transfer their assets in the country to the Order of Christ, specially created for this purpose.

Denis was essentially an administrator and not a warrior king. He went to war with the kingdom of Castile in 1295, relinquishing the villages of Serpa and Moura. In 1297, he signed the Treaty of Alcañices with Castile, which defined the current borders between the two Iberian countries, and reaffirmed Portugal's possession of the Algarve. The treaty also established an alliance of friendship and mutual defense, leading to a peace of 40 years between the two nations.

Denis pursued his father's policies on legislation and centralisation of power, and promulgated the nucleus of a Portuguese civil and criminal law code, protecting the lower classes from abuse and extortion. These edicts survived in the Livro das Leis e Posturas (Book of Laws and Postures), and the Ordenações Afonsinas (Alfonsine Ordinances), proclaimed during the reign of Afonso V. These are not legislative "codes" as we understand them today, but rather compilations of laws and customary municipal law, as amended and restated by the Portuguese crown.

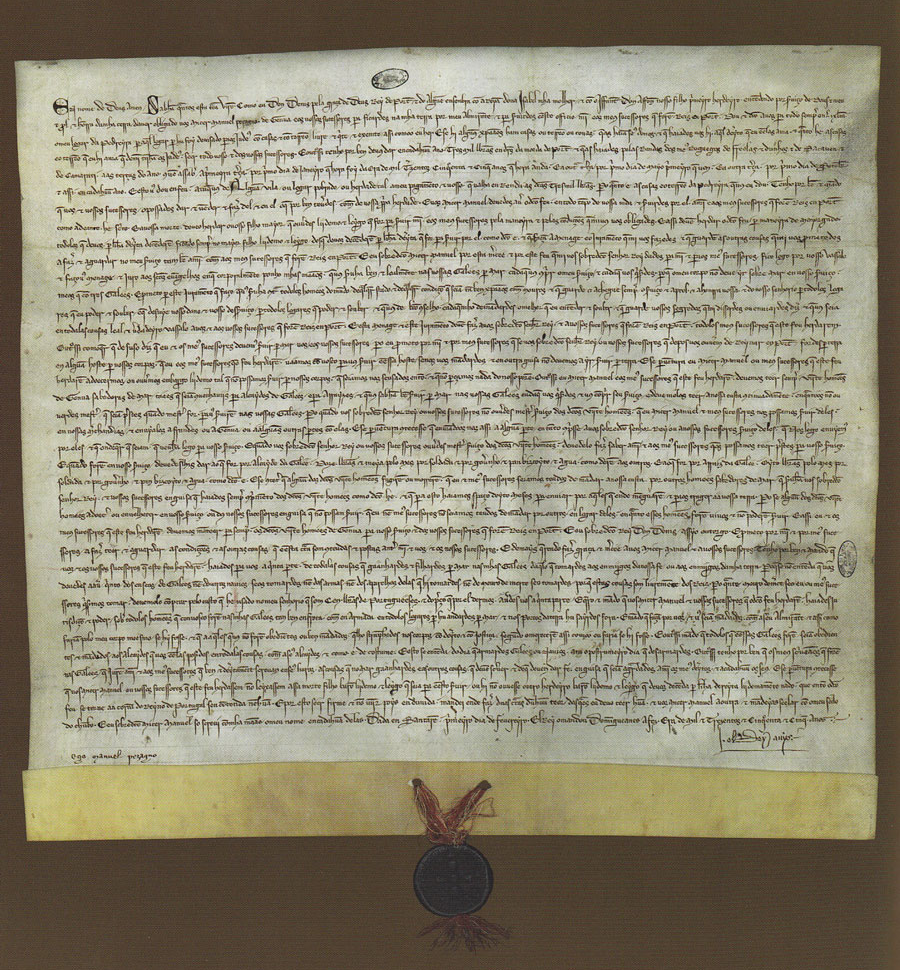
Contract between Denis and Manuel Pessanha

As king, Denis travelled around the country to resolve various problems. He ordered the construction of numerous castles, created new towns, and granted the privileges due cities to several others. He declared in 1290 that 'the language of the people' was to become the language of the state, and officially known as Portuguese. Denis also decreed that Portuguese replace Latin as the language of the law courts in his kingdom. His wife Elizabeth donated much of the large income generated by her lands and properties to charities, inspiring Denis to help improve the life of the poor and found several social institutions.

The frequent procedural issues that arose when he issued his decrees increasingly occupied Denis in his quest to frame the common law as being within the scope of the crown's jurisdiction, and in exercising royal power in the realm. The restrictions he placed on the actions of alvazis (local council officials), judges, as well as proctors and advocates in the courts, show that a merely nominal power of the monarchy over all the inhabitants of the kingdom, as was typical in the Middle Ages, was not compatible with his effort to assert a royal prerogative to scrutinise legal procedures or moralise on the exercise of justice. The appointment of magistrates clearly marks the start of the process of the crown claiming territorial jurisdiction, thus expanding the royal domain, along with the growing importance of Lisbon as the nation's de facto capital. The preference for Lisbon as a venue of the royal court was accentuated during Denis's long reign. There was as yet no official capital of the country, but Lisbon's location, as well as its advanced urban, economic and commercial development, made the city the most viable choice for a national centre of administration.

Its geographical situation between the ancient divisions of the country, i.e., the north and the south, enhanced Lisbon's status as the most practical centre for an emergent united Portuguese nation, the south now receiving as much royal attention as the north and becoming the residence of the monarchy. Their different characters created a realm where the two regions complemented each other. The great manors were closer together in the north, and the vast dominions conquered from the Muslims in the south, as well as the large areas of unclaimed land there, expanded the domain of the crown, and much of the territory of the extreme south came under the control of the military orders.

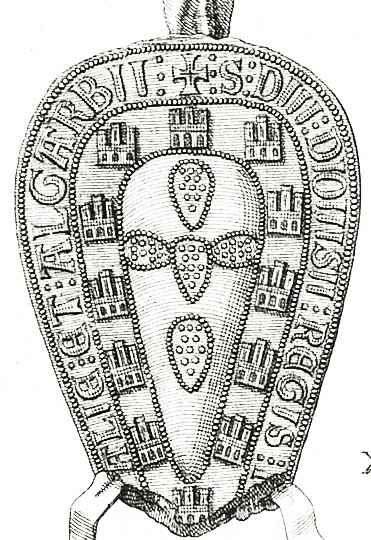
Seal of king Denis.

Denis promoted development of the rural infrastructure, earning the nickname of "the Farmer" (o Lavrador). He redistributed land, founded agricultural schools to improve farming techniques, and took a personal interest in the expansion of exports. He set up regular markets in a number of towns and regulated their activities. One of his principal achievements was to protect agricultural lands from advancing coastal sands by ordering the planting of a pine forest near Leiria, which also provided a source of raw materials for construction of a naval fleet. This forest, known as the Pinhal de Leiria (Leiria Pinewood), still exists, and is an important conservation area.

== Later years and death ==
The latter part of Denis' generally peaceful reign was nevertheless marked by internal conflicts. The contenders were his two sons: Afonso, the legitimate heir, and Afonso Sanches, his bastard son, who quarreled frequently among themselves for royal favour. At the time of Denis' death in 1325, he had placed Portugal on an equal footing with the other Iberian Kingdoms.

Afonso, born in Lisbon, was the rightful heir to the Portuguese throne. However, he was not Denis' favourite son, the old king preferring Afonso Sanches, his illegitimate son by Aldonça Rodrigues Talha. The notorious rivalry between the half brothers led to civil war several times. Elizabeth would serve as intermediary between her husband and Afonso during the civil war of 1322–1324.

Infante Afonso greatly resented the king, whom he accused of favouring Afonso Sanches. Denis had little popular support in the war because of the many privileges he had granted to the nobles in the last years of his reign, while the Infante had the support of the county's cities; these circumstances were rooted in the longstanding conflict between the upper and lower classes of Portuguese society. Repulsed to the town of Alenquer, which supported the Infante, Denis was prevented from killing his son through the intervention of the Queen. As legend holds, in 1323, Elizabeth, mounted on a mule, positioned herself between the opposing armies on the field of the Battle of Alvalade in order to prevent the combat. Peace returned in 1324 when Afonso Sanches was sent into exile and the Infante swore loyalty to the king.

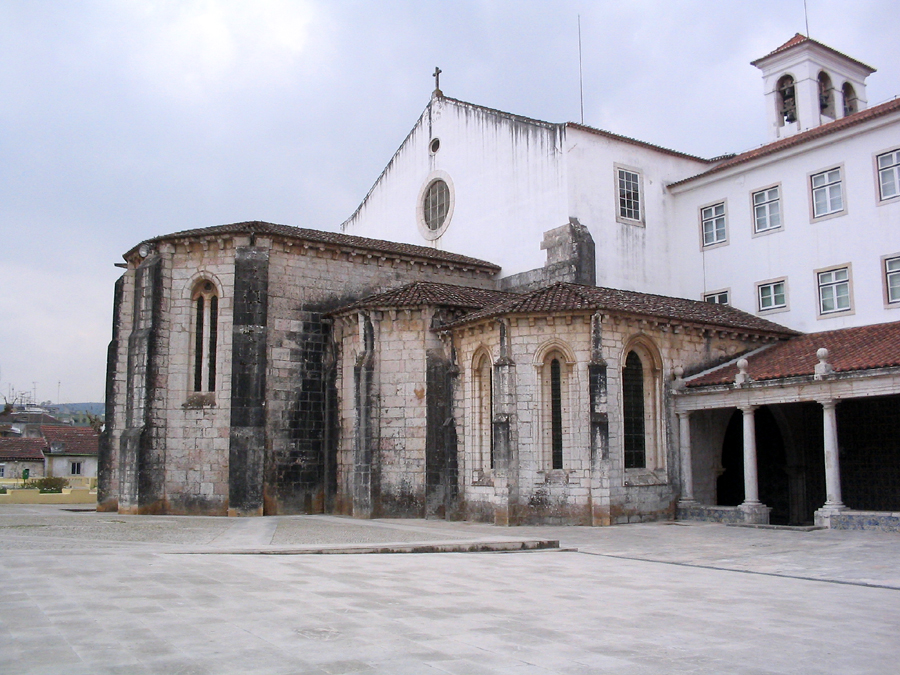
Remains of the medieval Monastery of Saint Denis in Odivelas

King Denis died on 7 January 1325 at Santarém, and was buried in the Monastery of Saint Denis in Odivelas, near Lisbon. Afonso then became king, whereupon he exiled his rival to Castile, and stripped him of all the lands and fiefdoms bestowed by their father. From Castile, Afonso Sanches orchestrated a series of attempts to usurp the crown. After he failed several times to mount an invasion of Portugal, the brothers signed a peace treaty, arranged by Afonso IV's mother Queen Elizabeth.

== Appraisal of reign ==
Bearing in mind the many centuries that separate Denis from the present, an impression of his personality can be gathered from the historical record: he was determined, even obstinate, in his attempts to systematically centralise the government and consolidate royal power. For example, he launched general inquiries (Inquirições gerais) at a remarkably accelerated pace to investigate land ownership and identify cases where abuses were committed.

Denis revealed early on his ability as an effective strategist in the pursuit of his goals, and as an innovator of proactive legislative policy. With the benefit of hindsight, it is clear that his administrative decisions were not made randomly or without consideration of his ideal of a well-governed nation. The wide range of his policies is indicated by a few examples: the concomitant creation of new towns and trade fairs, the fortification of the country's borders and the increasing dependence of the military orders on the royal power. He was recognized as an intelligent, perceptive ruler with demonstrated success, both by contemporaries and by later historians.

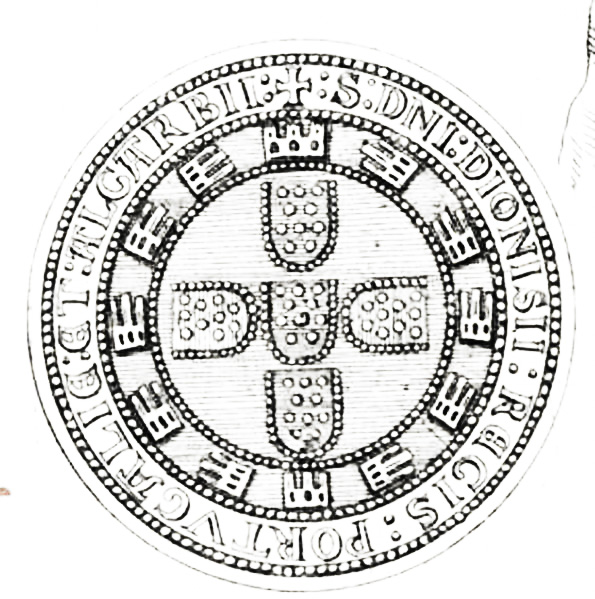
Circular seal of king Denis.

Denis was not lacking in political skill. Being adroit in negotiation and a student of human nature, he knew how to go about "opposing and appeasing alternately the secular and the ecclesiastical manorial interests. He confiscated the properties of the clergy, but made the concordat [of 1289] with the Portuguese bishops; he restricted the comedoria (victuals) rights of the monasteries, but replaced those rights with a fixed annual sum of money. His actions were sufficiently [statesmanlike, and his political position was strong] enough, for him to secure the confiscation laws and check the erosion of the state patrimony". As administration of the royal properties became more efficient and he became richer, Denis gained fame for his wealth, even being mentioned in Dante Alighieri's Divine Comedy, where he was called Dionysus Agricola, and described among those condemned by the Eagle, in the Sixth Sphere, though the exact reason for this condemnation is unknown.

Nevertheless, Denis is described in contemporary chronicles as a wise and able ruler. Although most of the legislative work of his reign focused on procedural juridical issues, the purpose of much of this new legislation was to avoid excessive delays and court costs and to prevent abuse by attorneys and prosecutors. The personal determination that allowed Denis to achieve so much in the political realm could sometimes harden into obstinacy and arrogance. He was described occasionally as cruel, especially in family relations, shown for example in the way he dealt with his legitimate son and rightful heir, Afonso (never his favourite), and his wife, Elizabeth, to whom he turned over the children born of his infidelities, leaving her the responsibility of their care and education.

An inescapable figure in the history of the Iberian Peninsula in the 13th and the beginning of the 14th centuries, Denis was first called "father of his country" (Pai da Pátria) by the historian Duarte Nunes de Leão in 1600.

== Physical description ==
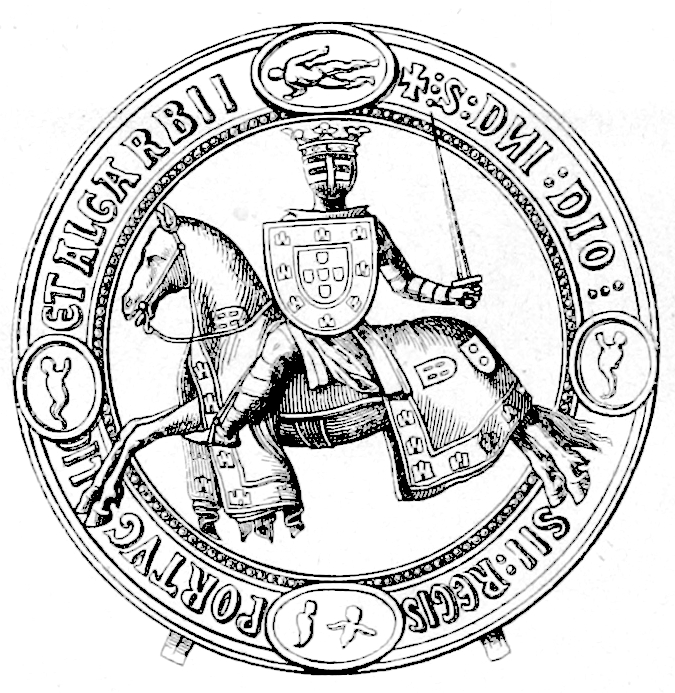
Seal of king Denis.

The historical sources of King Denis's time, as well as later authors, failed to provide any detailed physical description of the monarch. The information known comes from an accidental opening of his tomb during a restoration in 1938. It was discovered that the legend of a figure of towering height was not an accurate one as he was only about 1.65 metres (5 feet 5 inches) tall. Denis made his will when he was 61 and died at age 63. He apparently enjoyed excellent health throughout his life, as he traveled frequently, got involved in wars from an early age and at age 60 still hunted. He died with complete dentition, a rarity for the time, something that even today continues to be fairly unusual.

A distinctive feature of his physiognomy revealed by examination of the body was that his hair and beard were auburn. This is a curious fact, as he was the first of the Portuguese royal line up to that time to have that hair color. This genetic trait could have been passed on the maternal side, as his uncle Ferdinand, called "La Cerda", or "the bristly one", had red hair as well. Denis may have inherited the trait from Henry II of England, who was his ancestor on both the paternal and maternal sides, or even possibly from his maternal great-grandmother Elisabeth of Hohenstaufen, granddaughter of the Holy Roman Emperor Frederick Barbarossa ("barbarossa" means "red beard" in Italian).

== Opening of the tomb ==
In 2016, the tomb of the king was opened for the first time since 1938. Initially a restoration work, the tomb became the subject of research. A physiognomic report of the king is expected to be published in the future. Among other artefacts, the king's sword was retrieved from the tomb; it was found to be in a good state of preservation, except that the point had broken off.

== Marriage and descendants ==
Denis' only wife was Isabel or Elizabeth of Aragon, daughter of Peter III of Aragon and Constance of Sicily. They married in 1282 and had a son and a daughter. Like other monarchs of the time, he had several illegitimate children as well.

Name	Birth	Death	Notes
By Elizabeth of Aragon (1271–1336; married in 1282)
Infanta Constança (Constance)	3 January 1290	18 November 1313	Queen of Castile by marriage to Ferdinand IV of Castile.
Infante Afonso	8 February 1291	28 May 1357	Succeeded him as Afonso IV, 7th King of Portugal.
By Grácia Anes Fróis
Pedro Afonso	1287	1354	3rd Count of Barcelos
By Aldonça Rodrigues de Telha
Afonso Sanches	1289	1329	Lord of Albuquerque and rival of his half-brother Afonso IV
By Maria Pires
João Afonso	c. 1295	1326	Lord of Lousã
By Marinha Gomes
Maria Afonso	b. 1301	?	married Juan Alfonso de la Cerda
Other illegitimate offspring
Fernão Sanches	b. 1290	1329	
Maria Afonso	c. 1301	1320	Religious at the Monastery of Odivelas

== See also ==
- Cantiga de amigo
- Galician-Portuguese

== Notes ==
Denis of Portugal House of Burgundy Cadet branch of the House of Capet Born: 9 October 1261 Died: 7 January 1325
Regnal titles
Preceded by Afonso III	King of Portugal; 1279–1325	Succeeded by Afonso IV
