= List of Les Rois maudits cast members and episodes =

1972 main titles

Maurice Druon's Les Rois maudits (The Accursed Kings) sequence of historical novels has been adapted twice as miniseries for French television. Dubbed "the French I, Claudius", the 1972 TV adaptation of Les Rois maudits was broadcast by the ORTF from 21 December 1972 to 24 January 1973 and has been called "hugely successful". A joint French-Italian adaptation was broadcast on France 2 from 7 November to 28 November 2005.

== Cast ==
Role	1972 Adaptation	2005 Adaptation	Character description
Robert of Artois	Jean Piat	Philippe Torreton	Lord of Conches and Count of Beaumont-le-Roger
Mahaut of Artois	Hélène Duc	Jeanne Moreau	Robert's aunt, and mother to Jeanne and Blanche
Philip the Fair	Georges Marchal	Tchéky Karyo	King of France
Louis, King of Navarre	Georges Ser	Guillaume Depardieu	Philip's eldest son
Marguerite, Queen of Navarre	Muriel Baptiste	Hélène Fillières	Louis' wife
Philippe, Count of Poitiers	Josep Maria Flotats	Éric Ruf	Philip's second son
Jeanne, Countess of Poitiers	Catherine Rich	Julie Depardieu	Philippe's wife and Blanche's sister
Charles, Count of La Marche	Gilles Béhat	Aymeric Demarigny	Louis and Philippe's younger brother
Blanche of Burgundy	Catherine Hubeau	Anne Malraux	Charles' wife and Jeanne's sister
Isabella, Queen of England	Geneviève Casile	Julie Gayet	Philip's daughter, called the "She-Wolf of France"
Charles, Count of Valois	Jean Deschamps	Jacques Spiesser	Philip's younger brother
Gautier d'Aunay	Vincent Gauthier	Pierre Thorieton	Equerry to Philippe, Count of Poitiers, and lover of Blanche
Philippe d'Aunay	Patrick Lancelot	Silvio Otteanu	Equerry to Charles, Count of Valois, and lover of Marguerite
Guillaume de Nogaret	Jacques Goasguen	Jérôme Anger	Philip's prime councillor and keeper of the seal
Enguerrand de Marigny	André Falcon	Jean-Claude Drouot	Philip's coadjutor
Hugues de Bouville	André Luguet	Jean-Claude Brialy	Philip's chamberlain
Marguerite de Bouville	Françoise Engel	Hélène Duc	Bouville's wife
Jacques de Molay	Xavier Depraz	Gérard Depardieu	Grand Master of the Knights Templar
Geoffroy de Charney	Pierre Nègre	Ovidiu Ghinita	Templar Preceptor of Normandy
Geoffroy de Gonneville	Régis Outin	Alin Otteanu	Templar Preceptor of Aquitaine
Spinello Tolomei	Louis Seigner	Luca Barbareschi	Siennese Lombard banker
Guccio Baglioni	Jean-Luc Moreau	Giuseppe Solieri	Tolomei's nephew
Lormet	Georges Staquet	Julien Lucas	Robert of Artois' aide-de-camp
Eliabel Cressay	Janine Crispin	Hélène Vincent	Widow of the Squire of Cressay
Pierre Cressay	Patrick Préjean	Julien Tortora	Her son
Jean Cressay	Guy Saint-Jean	Jérôme Huguet	Her son
Marie de Cressay	Anne Kreis	Ana Caterina Morariu	Her daughter
Portefruit	Robert Lombard	Philippe Uchan	Provost of Cressay
Everard	Jean-Pierre Jorris	Patrick Bouchitey	Knight of the Order of Templars
Jean de Marigny	René Roussel	Michel Hermon	Archbishop of Sens and younger brother of Enguerrand de Marigny
Béatrice d'Hirson	Catherine Rouvel	Jeanne Balibar	First lady-in-waiting to the Countess Mahaut
Alain de Pareilles	Pierre Gallon	Edouard Nikitine	Captain of the King's Archers
Robert Bersumée	Bruno Balp	Dan Badarau	Captain of the fortress Château Gaillard
Edward II of England	Michel Beaune	Christopher Buchholz	King of England and Isabella's husband
Clémence of Hungary	Monique Lejeune	Serena Autieri	Louis' second wife
Marie of Hungary	Denise Grey	Line Renaud	Clemence's grandmother
Jeanne, Countess of Beaumont	Françoise Giret	Toinette Laquière	Robert of Artois' wife
Eudeline	Claudine Raffali	Sophie de La Rochefoucauld	Servant with whom Louis has an affair and a daughter
Philip of Valois	Benoît Brione	Malik Zidi	Son of Charles, Count of Valois
Edward III of England	Jean-Louis Broust	Aurélien Wiik	Son of Edward II and Isabella
Philippa of Hainault	Françoise Burgi	Marie de Villepin	Queen Consort of Edward III, daughter of Guillaume, Count of Hainaut and Holland
Jeanne de Divion	Annie Bertin	Sophie Broustal	Forger in Robert of Artois' employ
Eudes of Burgundy	Georges Riquier	C. Florescu	Brother of Marguerite, Queen of Navarre and Jeanne of Burgundy
Roger Mortimer	Claude Giraud	Bruno Todeschini	English baron and rebel
Hugh Despenser the Younger	Gil Vidal	Andy Gillet	Favourite of Edward II
Lady Despenser	Florence Dunoyer	Angèle Humeau	Despenser's wife
Jacques Duèze	Henri Virlogeux	Claude Rich	Cardinal who becomes Pope John XXII
Gaucher de Châtillon	Jean Chevrier	Wadeck Stanczak	Constable of France
Robert, Count of Clermont	Alexandre Rignault	Ioan Siminie	Paternal uncle of Philip the Fair
Louis of Bourbon	Robert Nogaret	M. Radecu	Son of Robert, Count of Clermont
Adam Orleton	Jean Lanier	Serge Maillat	Bishop of Hereford and ally of Roger Mortimer
Henry, 3rd Earl of Lancaster	William Sabatier	Romain Rondeau	Son of Edmund Crouchback and nephew of Edward I
John Maltravers	André Mathis	Reus Alexandru	Longtime friend and supporter of Roger Mortimer
Giannino Baglioni (John the Posthumous)	Jean-Gérard Sandoz	Lorand Stoica	Son of Louis X and Clemence, raised in secret by Guccio Baglioni
Souastre	Claude Brosset	Frédéric Laforet	Rebel baron in Artois
Ogle	François Darbon	Costica Barbulescu	Barber loyal to Roger Mortimer
Adam Héron	Michel Clainchy	George Ulmeni	Aide-de-camp of Philippe, Count of Poitiers
Mathieu de Trie	Marcel Charvey	Grégoire Aubuy-Taulère	Louis' chamberlain
Jean de Cherchemont	Daniel Gall	Mircea Stohan	Chancellor of Phillipe V, Charles IV and Philippe VI
Louis, Count of Évreux	Robert Party	N/A	Philip the Fair's youngest brother
Thierry d'Hirson	Yvon Sarray	N/A	Béatrice d'Hirson's uncle
Jeanne of Burgundy	Ghislaine Porret	N/A	Sister of Marguerite, Queen of Navarre and Eudes of Burgundy; Philip of Valois' wife
Miles de Noyers	Michel Favory	N/A	Nephew of Gaucher V de Châtillon, Marshal of France under Philip the Fair and later advisor to Louis X, Philippe V, Charles IV and Philippe VI
Roger Mortimer the Elder	Samson Fainsilber	N/A	Mortimer's uncle
Edmund, Earl of Kent	Eric Kruger	N/A	Half-brother to Edward II and cousin to the French royals
Jean of Hainaut	Igor Tyczka	N/A	Brother and general to Guillaume, Count of Hainaut and Holland
Étienne de Mornay	Michel Bertay	N/A	Chancellor of Charles of Valois
Raoul de Presles	Christian Bertola	N/A	Philip's councillor
Francesco Caetani	Maurice Nasil	N/A	Cardinal
Napoleone Orsini	Pierre Marteville	N/A	Cardinal
Jean de Forez	Roger Jacquet	N/A	Supporter of Philippe, Count of Poitiers
Gérard de Alspaye	André Chazel	N/A	Guard at the Tower of London who aids in Mortimer's escape
Jacob van Artevelde	Christian Barbier	N/A	Flemish merchant befriended by Robert of Artois
William Montacute, 1st Earl of Salisbury	Serge Maillat	N/A	Longtime friend and supporter of Edward III
Narrator	Jean Desailly	N/A	
Jeanne, Lady Mortimer	N/A	Valérie Lang	Mortimer's wife
Jeanne of Navarre	N/A	Buciu Maria	Louis and Marguerite's daughter (4 years old)
Young Eudeline	N/A	F. Besson	Louis and Eudeline's illegitimate daughter

== Episodes ==
=== 1972 miniseries ===
No.	Title	Original Airdate
1	"Le Roi de fer"	21 December 1972
2	"La Reine étranglée"	28 December 1972
3	"Les Poisons de la couronne"	3 January 1973
4	"La Loi des mâles"	10 January 1973
5	"La Louve de France"	17 January 1973
6	"Le Lys et le lion"	24 January 1973

=== 2005 miniseries ===
No.	Title	Original Airdate
1	"Le Roi de fer"	7 November 2005
2	"La Reine étranglée"	8 November 2005
3	"Les Poisons de la couronne"	14 November 2005
4	"La Louve de France"	21 November 2005
5	"Le Lys et le lion"	28 November 2005
