= Thierry Larchier d'Hirson =

14th century bishop

- Bishop of Arras
- Province: Arras
- Elected: April 1328
- Term ended: August 23, 1328
- Other post: Canon of Arras (1299); Chancellor to Mahaut, Countess of Artois (1303); Prévôte of Aire-sur-la-Lys (1309)

Personal details
- Born: 1270 Bourbonnais, France
- Died: August 23, 1328 (aged 57–58) Arras, France
- Partner: Jeanne de Divion

Thierry Larchier d'Hirson or d'Hireçon, or de Hérisson, (1270 in Bourbonnais – 23 August 1328) was a French cleric under Robert II, Count of Artois.

== Biography ==
Hirson was employed by Philip IV of France on several occasions, and became a canon of Arras in 1299. He was named chancellor of Mahaut, Countess of Artois in 1303, and prévôte of Aire-sur-la-Lys in 1309. Hirson wielded considerable power in Artois for most of Mahaut's reign.

Hirson founded the Chartreuse du Val-Saint-Esprit (Val-Saint-Esprit Charterhouse), a Carthusian monastery, in 1320. He was appointed Bishop of Arras in April 1328, and died on 23 August 1328.

Hirson was romantically involved with Jeanne de Divion, wife of the knight Pierre de Broyes. She was known for her knowledge of astrology, and made a scandal by living openly with Hirson. When he died, he left Jeanne 3000 livres. The executor of his will, Countess Mahaut of Artois, paid the inheritance, but later challenged it as being based on an adulterous liaison with a bishop, and obtained the restitution. In revenge, Jeanne created forged documents which Mahaut's nephew, Robert III of Artois, used in 1331 to attest to the will of his father as a means to reclaim the County of Artois from Mahaut. This deception was discovered, and Jeanne was condemned and burned at the stake for forgery on 6 October 1331.

== Family ==
Hirson's niece Béatrice d'Hirson was a lady-in-waiting to Mahaut, Countess of Artois, as was her sister Mathilde. His brothers were as follows:

- Denis d'Hirson, treasurer to the Countess of Artois, then lord of Arras
- Guillaume d'Hirson, bailiff of Arras
- Pierre d'Hirson, attendant to the Countess of Artois

== In fiction ==
The dispute between Robert and Mahaut plays an important part in Maurice Druon's series of French historical novels, Les Rois maudits (The Accursed Kings). Hirson was played by Yvon Sarray in the 1972 French miniseries adaptation of the series.

Although an obscure historical figure, Béatrice is also an important character in Les Rois maudits. In the novels, she practices witchcraft and is adept with poisons. She helps her mistress Mahaut poison two French kings, and eventually poisons Mahaut herself. Béatrice was played by Catherine Rouvel in the 1972 miniseries, and by Jeanne Balibar in a 2005 adaptation.
