= Jeanne de Divion =

French forger

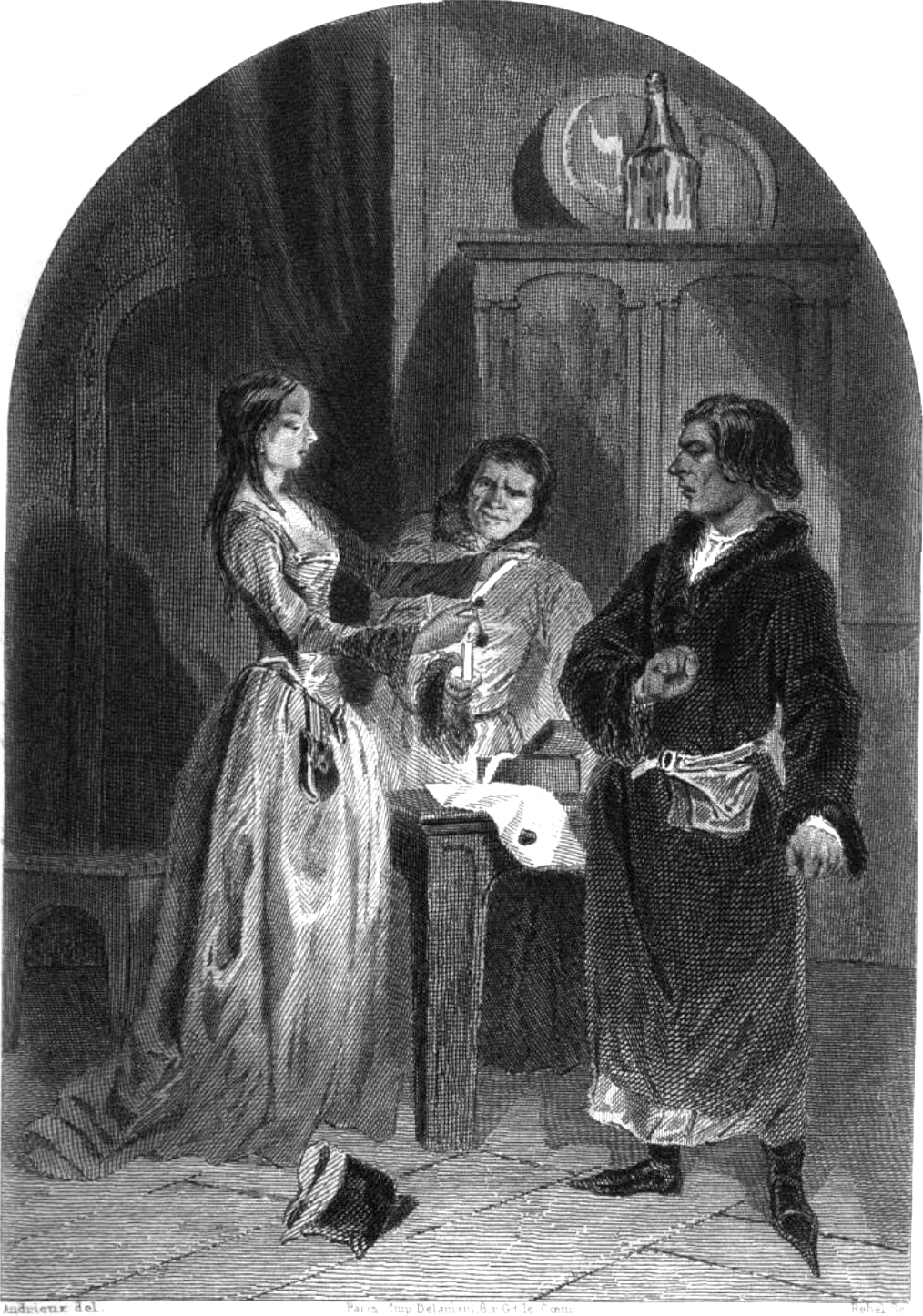
1861 illustration of Jeanne de Divion from Histoire de la prostitution chez tous les peuples du monde: depuis l'antiquité la plus reculée jusqu'à nos jours

Jeanne de Divion (c. 1293 – 6 October 1331) was a French forger.

Jeanne was the daughter of the impoverished noble Havet de Divion and Sara Louchard, and married the knight Pierre de Broyes. She was known for her knowledge of astrology, and made a scandal by living openly with her lover, Thierry Larchier d'Hirson. When d'Hirson, then the bishop of Arras, died, he left Jeanne 3000 livres. The executor of his will, Countess Mahaut of Artois, paid the inheritance but later challenged it as being based on an adulterous liaison with a bishop, and obtained the restitution.

In 1331, Countess Mahaut's nephew Robert used a forgery created by Jeanne attesting to the will of his father as a means to reclaim the County of Artois from Mahaut. This deception was discovered, and Robert lost any hope of acquiring Artois. Jeanne was condemned and burned at the stake for forgery on 6 October 1331, at the Place aux Pourceaux in Paris.

== In fiction ==
Jeanne de Divion is a minor character in Les Rois maudits (The Accursed Kings), a series of French historical novels by Maurice Druon which includes a retelling of her forgery. She was played by Annie Bertin in the 1972 French miniseries adaptation of the series, and by Sophie Broustal in the 2005 adaptation.
