= Erembourc de Moustereul =

Erembourc de Moustereul (died after 1328) was a French textile merchant. She succeeded Jeanne la Fouacière as the leading figure of the linen trade in 14th-century Paris.

She is listed as a linen weaver in 1298. She had become a substantial tax contributor in 1313 to such an extant that the tax collectors listed her spouse Fee Baudchon as "Fee Baudchon, husband of Eremburc de Moustereul", to signify that although her spouse was officially the taxpayer in accordance to the law of married women, it was in fact his wife who was the main taxpayer of the household.

She specialized in fine linen, but also traded in other textiles. She delivered to the Royal House and a number of other powerful clients, and among her customers were Mahaut of Artois, and the Pope of Avignon. She occasionally traded in other goods as well, as is illustrated when she delivered an order of saddles to the knights of the Avignon Pope in 1327-28. Her position is demonstrated by the fact that she had the privilege of participating in the inventory of the late members of the Royal House. In 1328, she was the only linen merchant in Paris to be given permission, as a deliverer to the royal court, to purchase the textiles of the late queen, Clemence of Hungary.
