= Jeanne la Fouacière =

Jeanne la Fouacière (or Jehanne) (died 1313) was a French linen merchant. She belonged to the elite of Parisian merchants and dominated the linen market in Paris in the late 13th and early 14th-century.

== Life ==
Her background is sketchy: it is known that she was a widow and had a sister by the name of Genevieve who was also a linen merchant and was married to a mercier, Guillaume St Marcel. Several circumstances signify that Jeanne la Fouacière as a leading merchant. She had clients among royalty and nobility: she is known to have delivered linen to the agents of the English royal court in 1278, 1307, and 1308, and to the Countess Mahaut of Artois in 1301 and 1310. In the tax registers, she was taxed for 16 Livres, which was around the same amount as the elite of Parisian burgher alderman at the time, while the average income was below one livre. She also had the right to do inventories of and acquire the textiles of deceased members of the royal family, which belonged only to those delivering goods to the royal household, and Jeanne was known to have this right, being as she was in possession of the beddings of the queen of France, Margaret of Provence, which she donated to the hospital in her will.

Her position as the leading linen merchant in Paris after her death was also a woman, Eremburc de Moustereul; listed as a linen weaver in 1298, she had become a substantial tax contributor in 1313 to such an extent that the tax collectors listed her spouse Fee Baudchon as "Fee Baudchon, husband of Eremburc de Moustereul", to signify that although her spouse was officially the taxpayer in accordance to the law of married women, it was in fact his wife who was the main taxpayer of the household; in 1328, she was the only linen merchant in Paris to be given permission, as a deliverer to the royal court, to purchase the textiles of the late queen, Clemence of Hungary.
