= Les Longs Manteaux =

Gilles Béhat
- English: The Long Coats
- Directed by: Gilles Béhat
- Written by: Jean-Louis Leconte; Gilles Béhat; Jean-Louis Leconte; G.J. Arnaud
- Produced by: Hugo Kusnet; Henri Lassa; Adolphe Viezzi
- Starring: Bernard Giraudeau
- Cinematography: Ricardo Aronovich
- Edited by: Armando Blanco; Jorge Valencia; Geneviève Vaury
- Music by: Jean-François Léon
- Production companies: Les Films de la Tour; TF1 Films Production
- Distributed by: Gaumont
- Release date: 19 February 1986 (France)
- Running time: 106 minutes
- Countries: France; Argentina
- Languages: French; Spanish

Les Longs Manteaux is a Franco-Argentine film, directed by Gilles Béhat, which links drama and action in the spaghetti-western genre. Released in 1986, it lasts 1 hour 46 minutes.

== Synopsis ==
Loïc Murat, a French geologist, makes camp on a Bolivian mountain. He comes across a group of fascists, Les Longs Manteaux, who want to assassinate the writer Juan Mendez. Murat also gets to know Julia, Mendez's daughter.

== Production ==
The army uniforms came from the Argentine Army.
