= Gilles Béhat =

French film director

Gilles Marc Béhat (3 September 1949) is a French filmmaker and actor.

== Biography ==
Gilles Béhat (Béat by birth) was born in Lille. The confusion around the "h" in his last name stems from an error in the credits of the first film he participated in as an actor: L'Hercule sur la place.

As a teenager, he played guitar with a rock band. He attended the Conservatoire d'Art Dramatique, taking acting classes.

He launching his career as an actor by taking roles in television series such as that of Pierre Vignard in L'Hercule sur la place and Charles IV le Bel in Les Rois maudits (1972) as well as in the cinema in films like Gérard Pires's 1970 film Elle court, elle court la banlieue, Jean Yanne's 1972 film Chobizenesse and Bernard Paul's 1975 film Beau Masque.

As a director, he made a series of feature films, including many detective and action films. He gained attention after the released of his 1984 gangster film Rue barbare. Several of his subsequent films, including Dancing Machine starring Alain Delon, were relative commercial failures. He then turned to television, where he directed series for TF1, France 2 and Canal+ in the 1990s.

In 2008, he returned to cinema, directing Diamant 13; a noir starring Gérard Depardieu, Olivier Marchal and Asia Argento.

== Filmography ==
=== Cinema ===
==== As actor ====
- 1970 : L'Hercule sur la place (as Pierre Vignaud)
- 1970: Elle court, elle court la banlieue
- 1973: Les valets clos
- 1975: Les Noces de Porcelaine
- 1975: Beau Masque
- 1976 : Le Tigre du ciel

==== As director ====
- 1973: Demain Matin (short, also actor)
- 1974: La Couleur de la Mer (short)
- 1978 : Haro!
- 1981 : Putain d'histoire d'amour
- 1984 : Rue barbare
- 1985 : Urgence
- 1986 : Charlie Dingo
- 1986 : Les Longs Manteaux
- 1988 : Le Manteau de Saint-Martin
- 1990 : Dancing Machine
- 1991 : Le Vent de la Toussaint
- 1994 : Le Cavalier des nuages
- 2009 : Diamant 13

=== Television ===
==== As actor ====
- 1971 : La Dame de Montsoreau (as Epernon)
- 1972 : Les Boussardel
- 1972 : Les Rois maudits, de Claude Barma (as Charles IV le Bel)
- 1972 : Les Enquêtes du commissaire Maigret : Maigret en meublé (as Van Damme)
- 1974 : La Cloche tibétaine (as Victor Point)
- 1977 : Un juge, un flic: (episode: Flambant neuf)

==== As director ====
- 1995 : L'Auberge de la Jamaïque
- 1996 : Les Cordier, juge et flic (episode: Le petit juge)
- 1996 : Les Cordier, juge et flic (episode: La mémoire blessée)
- 1997 : Les Cordier, juge et flic (episode: Boulot de flic)
- 1997 : Les Cordier, juge et flic (episode: Le petit frère)
- 1997 : Julie Lescaut (episode: Interdit au public)
- 1997 : Un enfant au soleil
- 1998 : Julie Lescaut (episode: Bal masqué)
- 1999 : Une femme d'honneur (episode: Bébés volés)
- 2000 : Une mère en colère
- 2001 : Les Cordier, juge et flic (episode: Saut périlleux)
- 2002 : Les Cordier, juge et flic (episode: Otages)
- 2003 : Les Cordier, juge et flic (episode: Adieu mulet)
- 2004 : Les Cordier, juge et flic (episode: Faux départ)
- 2004 : Père et Maire (episode: Entre père et mère)
- 2005: Père et Maire (episode: Les liens du cœur)
- 2006: Père et Maire (episode: Retour de flammes)
- 2004 : Alex Santana, négociateur
- 2007 : Paris, enquêtes criminelles (episodes: Requiem pour un assassin, Fantome, Le Serment, Scalpel)
- 2007: Commissaire Cordier (episode: Redemption)
- 2008: R.I.S. Police scientifique (episodes: Jugement dernier, Eaux profondes)
