= Lyons-la-Forêt =

- Commune
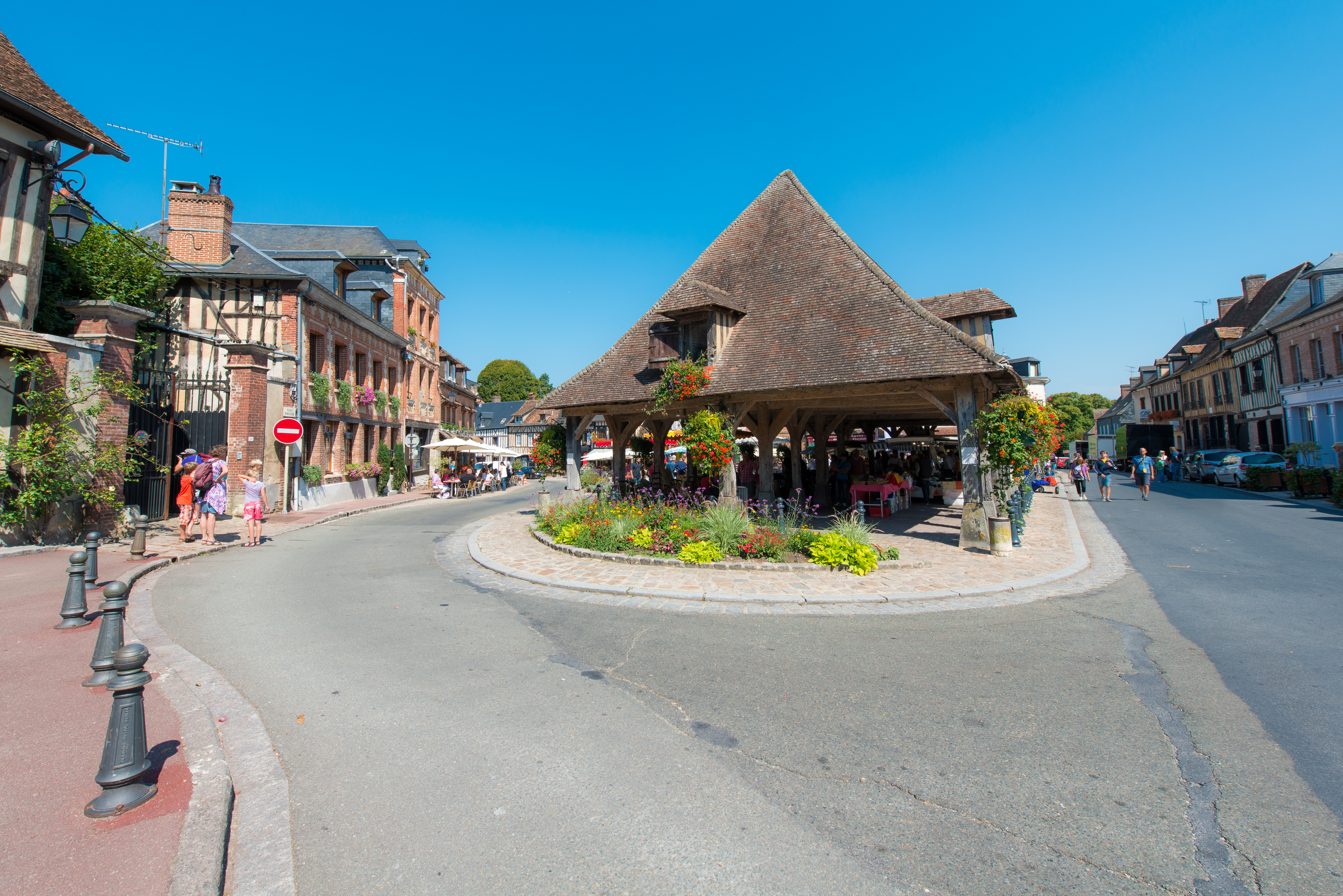
- 17th-century covered market

- Coat of arms
- Location of Lyons-la-Forêt
- Location within France Location within Normandy
- Coordinates: 49°24′01″N 1°28′37″E
- Country: France
- Region: Normandy
- Department: Eure
- Arrondissement: Les Andelys
- Canton: Romilly-sur-Andelle

Government
  - Mayor (2020–2026): Thierry Plouvier
- Area^{1}: 26.99 km^{2} (10.42 sq mi)
- Elevation: 163 m (535 ft)
- Highest elevation: 178 m (584 ft)
- Lowest elevation: 67 m (220 ft)
- Population (2023): 756
  - Density: 28.0/km^{2} (72.5/sq mi)
- Time zone: UTC+01:00 (CET)
  - Summer (DST): UTC+02:00 (CEST)
- INSEE/Postal code: 27377 /27480
- ^{1} French Land Register data, which excludes lakes, ponds, glaciers > 1 km^{2} (0.386 sq mi or 247 acres) and river estuaries.

Lyons-la-Forêt (French pronunciation: [ljɔ̃s la fɔʁɛ]) is a commune of the Eure department, Normandy, in northwest France. Lyons-la-Forêt has distinctive historical geography, and architecture, and contemporary culture, as a consequence of the Forest of Lyons, and its bocage, and of the adjacent Pays de Bray. It is a member of Les Plus Beaux Villages de France (The Most Beautiful Villages of France) Association.

== Geography ==
Lyons-la-Forêt is located 34 km (21 mi) from Rouen and 28 km (17 mi) from Gisors. Former name: Saint-Denis-en-Lyons.

Lyons was originally the name of the forest Licontio-/Ligontio-, based probably on the Celtic root lic/lig, that is also found in the name of the stream: la Lieure Licoris /Ligoris. Same root as the river Loire < Liger and -ley in Beverley (Yorkshire) from Celtic *bibro *licos > Old English beofor beaver, *licc stream.

== History ==
An early mention of a ducal residence in Lyons can be found in 936, when William I, Duke of Normandy used to stay. The castle of Lyons-la-Forêt was constructed at the start of the 12th century by Henry I of England, also known as "Henri Beauclerc". He died there in 1135, supposedly from "a surfeit of lampreys".

The town and the castle were occupied by King Philip II Augustus of France in 1193 but the following year, Richard I of England, back from captivity, obtained the restitution of Lyons; the king of England and Duke of Normandy stayed frequently until 1198. In 1202, Philip II Augustus re-conquered the city, and after him, several French kings were attracted by the Lyons forest and the good hunting grounds.

From 1359 to 1398, the castellan domain of Lyons was part of Blanche de Navarre's dower after she became the widow of King Philip VI of France. In 1403–1422, it was the dower of Isabeau de Bavière, wife of King Charles. In 1419, in the course of the Hundred Years' War, the English took Lyons.

During the Second World War, the area was used for parachute drops of agents F. F. E. Yeo-Thomas and André Dewavrin.

== Population ==
Historical population
Year	Pop.	±% p.a.
1968	880	—
1975	772	−1.85%
1982	734	−0.72%
1990	701	−0.57%
1999	795	+1.41%
2007	759	−0.58%
2012	744	−0.40%
2017	723	−0.57%
2023	756	+0.75%
Source: INSEE

== Gallery ==
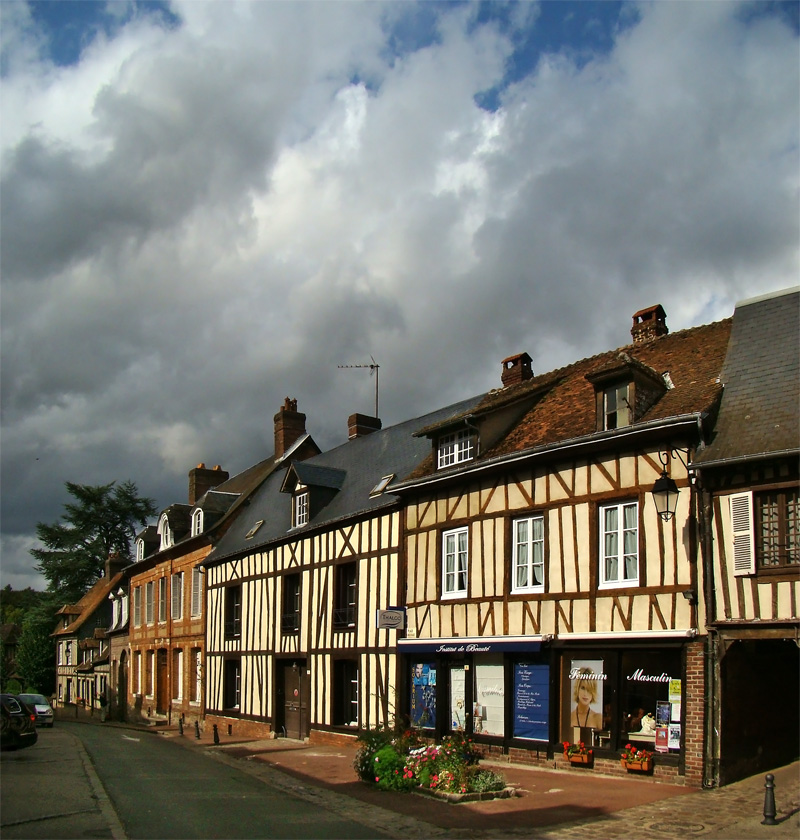
Normandy style houses

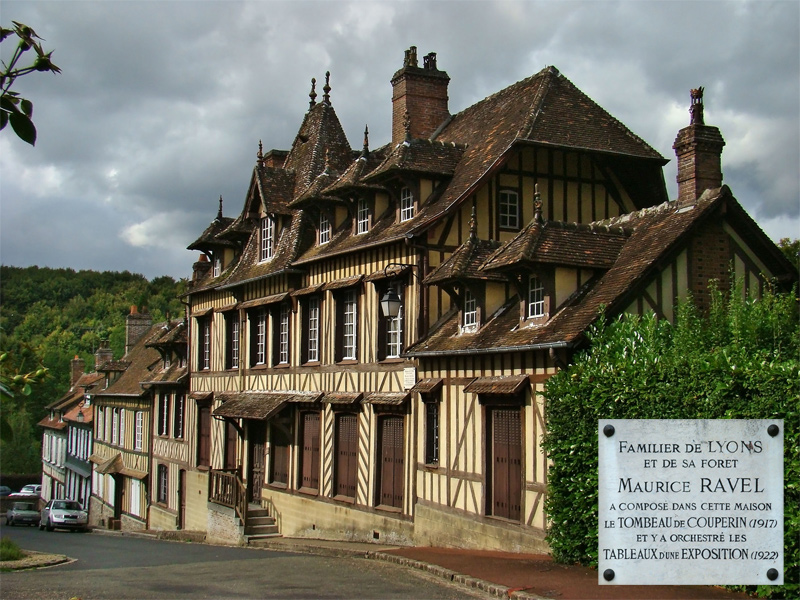
Maurice Ravel's mansion

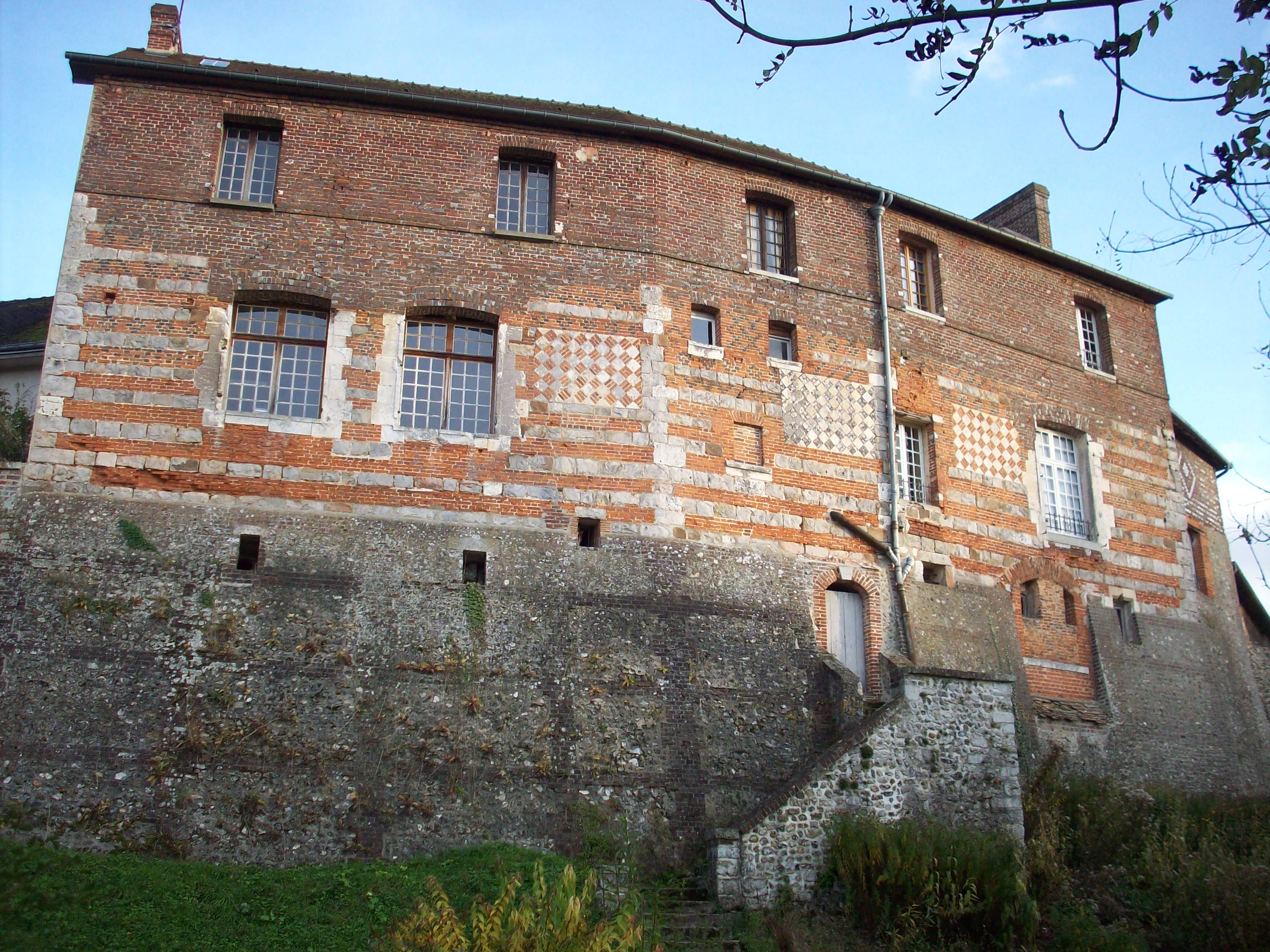
Remains of the rampart

== Sights ==
- Gallo-Roman theatre (private property)
- Castle of Henry I of England (private property)
- Covered market place (18th century)
- Church Saint-Denis (12th and 18th centuries)
- Town hall (17th century)
- Houses built in typical Normandy style (17th and 18th centuries)
- The forest is 10,700 hectares, the largest state forest in Normandy and one of the largest Beech forests in Europe. It is renowned for the "cathedral-like" straightness and height of its trees' trunks. One of its characteristics is its numerous open spaces and clearings among which lie small villages and hamlets. This makes a transition between the Vexin plateau and the Andelle valley.

== Personalities ==
- Henry I of England died on 1 December 1135 of food poisoning from eating "a surfeit of lampreys" (of which he was excessively fond) at Lyons-la-Forêt (then Saint-Denis-en-Lyons). The mucus and serum of several lamprey species, including the Caspian lamprey (Caspiomyzon wagneri), river lamprey (Lampetra fluviatilis and L. planeri), and sea lamprey (Petromyzon marinus), are known to be toxic and require thorough cleaning before cooking and consumption.
- Lyons-la-Forêt was the birthplace of Enguerrand de Marigny (1260–1315), chamberlain and minister of Philip IV the Fair.
- It was also the birthplace of Isaac de Benserade, French poet (1612–1691), who was one of the first intellectuals in France to evoke female homosexuality in a theater play.
- Maurice Ravel stayed in Lyons many times from 1917 to 1922. He wrote music including Le Tombeau de Couperin in Le Fresne, one of the old mansions of Lyons-la-Forêt.
- Monique de La Bruchollerie (1915 – 1972), the classical concert pianist, lived there all her life with her family.
- Gérard Souzay (1918 – 2004), the French baritone, lived there for a while during the Second World War, at la Fontaineresse, on the banks of the Lieure.
- Émile-Jacques Ruhlmann (1879 – 1933) was a renowned French designer of furniture and interiors. His house is described in several publications concerning his life and work.
- The artist Paul-Émile Pissarro (the youngest son of Camille Pissarro) lived here for some years from 1922, when he bought a house and had the garden designed by his godfather, Claude Monet.

== See also ==
- Communes of the Eure department
