= Hugues de Bouville =

Chamberlain of Philip IV of France

Hugues III de Bouville
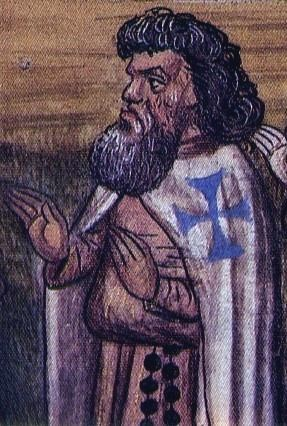
- 15th century mixture of Hugues III, comte de Bouville

Grand Chamberlain of France
- Monarch: Philip IV of France
- Preceded by: Enguerrand de Marigny

Personal details
- Born: 1275
- Died: 1331
- Spouse: Marguerite des Barres
- Children: Charles de Bouville
- Parents: Hugues II de Bouville (d. 1304) (father); Marie de Chambly (mother)

Hugues III de Bouville (1275–1331) was the chamberlain of Philip IV of France.

== Biography ==
The son of Hugues II de Bouville (d. 1304) and Marie de Chambly, he is the brother of John IV de Bouville. His father Hugues II was also chamberlain and secretary to Philip IV until Bouville's death at the Battle of Mons-en-Pévèle in 1304, at which point he was replaced by his protégé Enguerrand de Marigny (1260–1315), who became Philip's Grand Chamberlain and chief minister.

Later, as Philip IV's chamberlain, the younger Bouville was sent as ambassador to Naples in 1314 to fetch Clementia of Hungary to marry Philip's son, Louis, King of Navarre. Bouville also became the protector of Louis' child, John I of France, in 1316.

Bouville married Marguerite des Barres (b. 1291), later the mother of his son Charles de Bouville, who was chamberlain of Charles V of France and governor of Dauphiné (1370).

Charles married Isabeau de Metz and died childless on 8 August 1385 at La Côte-Saint-André; he was buried in the church Saint-André in Grenoble. Charles VI of France temporarily granted the Council delphinal the government of Dauphiné before appointing Enguerrand d'Eudin as governor.

== In fiction ==
Bouville is an important character in Les Rois maudits (The Accursed Kings), a series of French historical novels written by Maurice Druon in the 1950s. He was played by André Luguet in the 1972 French miniseries adaptation of the series, and by Jean-Claude Brialy in the 2005 adaptation. His wife Marguerite was portrayed by Françoise Engel in 1972 and by Hélène Duc in 2005.
