= Catherine Rouvel =

French actress

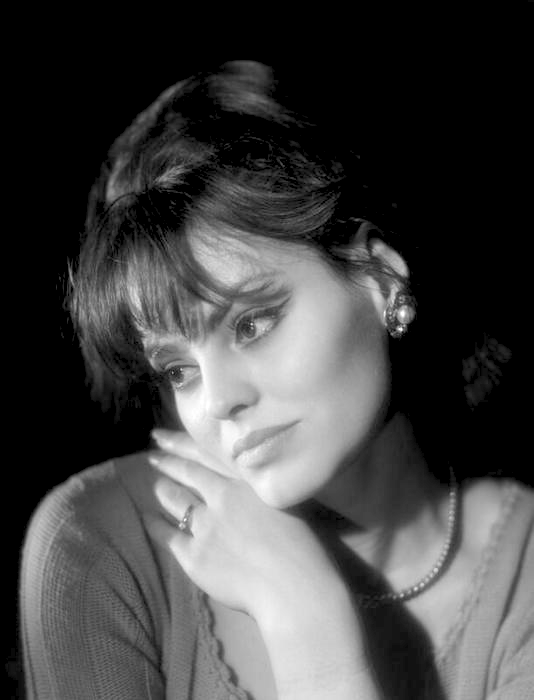
- Rouvel in 1966.
- Born: Catherine Vitale; 31 August 1939 (age 86); Marseille, France
- Occupation: Actress
- Years active: 1956-2019

Catherine Rouvel (born Catherine Vitale; 31 August 1939 in Marseille) is a French actress. Her career spans from the late 1950s to the late 2010s.

== Biography ==
At 14, she took dance classes, which she abandoned in favor of theater. She made her debut with plays by Molière. She read Racine and, with Marie-France Boyer, founded the Théâtre Grignan (1956-1957), which became the Théâtre Quotidien de Marseille.

Rouvel had her breakthrough role in 1959 when she starred in the film Picnic on the Grass (Le Déjeuner sur l'herbe), directed by Jean Renoir. Afterwards, while regularly appearing in films, she proved more interested in theatre where she performed works by Marcel Pagnol, Jacques Audiberti and Fyodor Dostoevsky. She also found success on French television where she appeared in the miniseries L'Éducation sentimentale (1971, based on Gustave Flaubert's novel of the same name) and Les Rois maudits (1972, based on Maurice Druon's The Accursed Kings). In 1970 she appeared in the major box-office hit Borsalino, where she played the girlfriend of the gangster portrayed by Alain Delon. She and Delon reprised their roles in the sequel Borsalino & Co. (1974). Rouvel's other notable films include Claude Chabrol's The Breach (1970), Marcel Carné's Les Assassins de l'ordre (1971) and Jean-Jacques Annaud's Black and White in Color (1976).

From the 1980s, Rouvel focused on television work, appearing in various miniseries and TV movies. From the early 1990s, she returned to the theatres of her native Marseille, where she appeared in a dozen plays while still playing occasional supporting roles on the big screen. She became less active on screen during the 2000s, but kept working on stage.

== Selected filmography ==
- 1959 : Picnic on the Grass (Le Déjeuner sur l'herbe) by Jean Renoir : Nénette
- 1963 : Chair de poule by Julien Duvivier : Maria
- 1964 : Les Pas perdus by Jacques Robin : Mazurka
- 1968 : Benjamin by Michel Deville : Victorine
- 1970 : Borsalino by Jacques Deray : Lola
- 1970 : The Breach (La Rupture) by Claude Chabrol : Sonia
- 1971 : I Miss Sonja Henie
- 1971 : Les Assassins de l'ordre by Marcel Carné : Danielle Lebègue
- 1971 : Le Soldat Laforêt by Guy Cavagnac : Diane
- 1973 : Les Volets clos by Jean-Claude Brialy : Flora
- 1973 : Oh, If Only My Monk Would Want (Ah! Si mon moine voulait...) by Claude Pierson
- 1974 : The Marseille Contract by Robert Parrish : Brizzard's mistress
- 1974 : Borsalino & Co. by Jacques Deray : Lola
- 1976 : Black and White in Color (La Victoire en chantant, or Noirs et Blancs en couleur) by Jean-Jacques Annaud : Marinette
- 1986 : Jubiabá by Nelson Pereira dos Santos: Amélia
- 1987 : Sand and Blood (De sable et de sang) by Jeanne Labrune : Carmina
- 1995 : Élisa by Jean Becker : Manina
- 2011 : En enkel till Antibes by Richard Hobert

=== Television ===
- 1971: L'Éducation sentimentale, miniseries
- 1972: Les Rois maudits, miniseries directed by Claude Barma: Béatrice d'Hirson
- 1972: Clochemerle, BBC TV miniseries: Judith Toumignon
- 1973: Arsène Lupin (TV series, 1 episode)
- 1984: Les Ferrailleurs des Lilas (TV movie)
- 1987: Les Enquêtes du commissaire Maigret (TV series, 1 episode)
- 1988: Les Dossiers de l'inspecteur Lavardin (TV series, 1 episode)
- 1998: La Clé des champs (miniseries)
- 2019: Capitaine Marleau (TV series, 1 episode)
