= Borsalino (film) =

1970 gangster film by Jacques Deray

- French theatrical release poster
- Directed by: Jacques Deray
- Screenplay by: Jean-Claude Carrière; Jean Cau; Jacques Deray; Claude Sautet
- Based on: The Bandits of Marseilles; 1959 novel by Eugene Saccomano
- Produced by: Alain Delon; Henri Michaud
- Starring: Alain Delon; Jean-Paul Belmondo
- Cinematography: Jean-Jacques Tarbès
- Edited by: Paul Cayatte
- Music by: Claude Bolling
- Production companies: Adel Productions; Marianne Productions; Mars Film Produzione
- Distributed by: Paramount Pictures
- Release date: 20 May 1970
- Running time: 125 minutes
- Countries: France; Italy
- Languages: French; Italian
- Budget: FRF 14 million
- Box office: $35.3 million $1.1 million (US)

Borsalino is a 1970 gangster film directed by Jacques Deray and starring Jean-Paul Belmondo, Alain Delon and Catherine Rouvel. It was entered into the 20th Berlin International Film Festival. In 2009, Empire named it No. 19 in a poll of "The 20 Greatest Gangster Movies You've Never Seen… Probably". A sequel, Borsalino & Co., was released in 1974 with Alain Delon in the leading role. The film is based on real-life gangsters Paul Carbone and François Spirito, who collaborated with Nazi Germany during the occupation of France in World War II (though this is not mentioned in the film).

== Plot ==
In 1930, in Marseille, a gangster named Siffredi is released from prison and searches for his former girlfriend, Lola. He finds her with Capella, another gangster. The two men fight over her but become friendly and form a partnership, fixing horseraces and prizefights.

They are contacted by Rinaldi, a lawyer who works for Marello and Poli, the two crime bosses who control all the organized crime in Marseille. Rinaldi suggests that Siffredi and Capella should seize control of Marseille's fish market and take it away from Marello. They succeed but they become too ambitious and try to take control of the meat market which is controlled by Poli. He tries to have Capella and Siffredi killed but they succeed in killing him instead. Rinaldi is killed by another gangster named The Dancer.

Capella and Siffredi establish themselves as the new bosses of Marseille's underworld. Afraid of future fights with Siffredi, Capella decides to leave Marseille: but he is shot by an assassin and dies in the arms of his friend.

== Cast ==
- Jean-Paul Belmondo – François Capella
- Alain Delon – Roch Siffredi
- Arnoldo Foà – Marello
- Catherine Rouvel – Lola
- Françoise Christophe – Simone Escarguel
- Corinne Marchand – Mme Rinaldi
- Laura Adani – Mme Siffredi, la mère de Roch
- Nicole Calfan – Ginette
- Hélène Rémy – Lydia
- Odette Piquet – La chanteuse
- Mario David – Mario
- Lionel Vitrant – Fernand
- Dennis Berry – Nono
- Jean Aron – Martial Roger, le compatible
- André Bollet – Poli
- Pierre Koulak – Spada

== Production ==
=== Development ===
Alain Delon wanted to produce the film because he was looking for a project in which to collaborate with Jean-Paul Belmondo. He found the story of Carbone and Spirito in a crime book he was reading about French gangsters from 1900 to 1970.

Originally the film was going to be called Carbone and Spirito, but after there were objections about using the names of real gangsters, the characters were fictionalized and the idea was dropped. Alain Delon said he wanted something like Vera Cruz because the title would not have to be translated all around the world. Eventually, the title was taken from the famous Borsalino company which had been making fedora-style hats since the late 19th century, including its distinctive Borsalino model. Its golden age was between the 1920s and 1940s, which is within the film's time frame. As a consequence of the movie, there was revival in the popularity of Borsalino hats.

=== Casting ===
Despite Delon's desire to work with Belmondo, the relationship between the pair broke down after filming was completed. Director Jacques Deray noted that, "All through production Delon was impeccable, never interfered. But when the film was completed "Delon the producer" stepped in and took it over." Delon said while promoting the film in the US:

We are still what you in America call pals or buddies. But we are not friends. There is a difference. He was my guest in the film but still he complained. I like him as an actor but as a person, he's a bit different. I think his reaction was a stupid reaction... almost like a female reaction. But I don't want to talk about him anymore.

Delon's associate producer, Pierre Caro, said:

If you ask me, I think Belmondo was afraid from the first to make a picture with Alain. He demanded the same number of close ups. Alain had to cancel a lot of his best scenes because they made him look better than Belmondo. My own feeling is that they will never work together again. Alain says they will but he lies.

Under the terms of their contracts, Belmondo and Delon were required to have the same number of close-ups, which prompted Delon to dye his hair black for his role.

Belmondo later sued Delon in court over the manner in which their names were billed in the production. Belmondo was annoyed that the title card "an Alain Delon Production" appeared before his name in the credits.

=== Filming ===
The film was shot on location in and around Marseille, France. Interiors were completed in Paris. The film remains one of the most expensive French films ever made. Finance mostly came from Paramount Pictures.

== Reception ==
The film was a large success at the French box office, breaking records throughout the country. It had admissions in France of 4,710,381. This made it the fourth most watched film of the year, after Le Gendarme en balade, Atlantic Wall, and Rider on the Rain. It was followed by The Red Circle, MASH, Once Upon a Time in the West, The Things of Life, Butch Cassidy and the Sundance Kid, Donkey Skin and The Damned.

The film was also very popular elsewhere in Europe, but did not break through in the US the way the filmmakers hoped. While it was released the Marković affair, which involved Delon, was still being heavily publicised, adding to the film's notoriety.

Variety said "problem is that pic is more a vehicle for its stars' personalities than a more cogent insight into French pre-war organized gangsters." Time Out remarked it was "fairly basic as a gangster pastiche ...but not unenjoyable thanks to its loudly stressed period detail and Claude Bolling's jolly score for mechanical piano."

== Death of Diana, Princess of Wales ==
On 31 August 1997, a late night broadcast of the film on British television channel BBC1 was interrupted by a report breaking the news that Diana, Princess of Wales had been involved in a car crash in Paris, which would ultimately claim her life.
