= Enguerrand de Marigny =

Royal court official under Philip IV of France

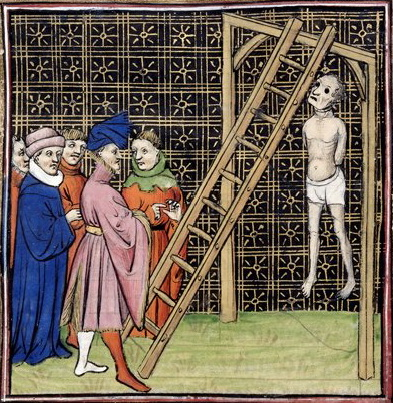
- The death of Marigny, from The Chroniques de France ou de St Denis

Chief Minister of France
- In office 11 July 1302 – 29 November 1314
- Monarch: Philip IV
- Preceded by: Pierre Flotte
- Succeeded by: Charles, Count of Valois

Grand Chamberlain of France
- In office 11 July 1302 – 29 November 1314
- Monarch: Philip IV
- Preceded by: Mathieu IV de Montmorency
- Succeeded by: Jean I de Melun

Guardian of the Treasury
- In office 1309–1314
- Monarch: Philip IV

Grand Panetier of France
- In office 1295–1297
- Monarch: Philip IV
- Succeeded by: Géraud II Chauchat

Personal details
- Born: c. 1260 Lyons-la-Forêt, Normandy, France
- Died: 30 April 1315 (aged 54-55) Paris, Île-de-France, France
- Spouses: Jeanne de Saint-Martin (m. 1298; died 1300) Alips de Mons (m. 1300; died 1315)
- Children: Louis de Marigny, Marie de Marigny, Isabelle de Marigny, Isabelle de Marigny, Alips de Marigny, Raoul de Marigny, Thomas de Marigny

Enguerrand de Marigny, Baron Le Portier (c. 1260 – 30 April 1315) was a French chamberlain and minister of Philip IV.

== Early life ==
He was born at Lyons-la-Forêt in Normandy, of an old Norman family of the lesser baronage called Le Portier, which took the name of Marigny about 1200, which was when Hughes Le Portier, Enguerrand's grandfather, married Mahaut de Marigny.

Enguerrand entered the service of Hugues II de Bouville, chamberlain and secretary of king Philip IV, as a squire, and then was attached to the household of Queen Jeanne, who made him one of the executors of her will. He married her god-daughter, Jeanne de St Martin. In 1298, he received the custody of the castle of Issoudun.

== Ministry ==
After the death of Pierre Flotte at the Battle of Courtrai in 1302, and de Bouville at the Battle of Mons-en-Pévèle in 1304, he became Philip's Grand Chamberlain and chief minister. In 1306 he was sent to preside over the exchequer of Normandy. He received numerous gifts of land and money from Philip as well as a pension from Edward II of England. Possessed of an ingratiating manner, politic, learned and astute, he acted as an able instrument in carrying out Philip's plans, and received corresponding confidence. He shared the popular odium which Philip incurred by debasing the coinage. He acted as the agent of Philip in his contest with Louis, Count of Nevers, the son of Robert III of Flanders, imprisoning Louis and forcing Robert to surrender Lille, Douai and Béthune.

He obtained for his half-brother Philip de Marigny in 1301 the bishopric of Cambrai, and in 1309 the archbishopric of Sens, and for his other half-brother Jean de Marigny in 1312 the bishopric of Beauvais and the bishopric of Senlis. Still another relative, Nicolas de Frauville, became the king's confessor and a cardinal. He addressed the Estates-General in 1314 and succeeded in getting further taxes for the Flemish war, incurring at the same time much ill will. This soon came to a head when the princes of the blood, eager to fight the Flemings, were disappointed by his negotiating a peace in September. He was accused of receiving bribes, and Charles of Valois denounced him to the king himself; but Philip stood by him and the attack was of no avail. The death of Philip IV on 29 November 1314 was a signal for a reaction against his policy. The feudal party, whose power the king had tried to limit, turned on his ministers and chiefly on his chamberlain.

== Downfall ==
Enguerrand was arrested by Louis X at the instigation of Charles of Valois, and forty-one articles of accusation including charges of receiving bribes were brought against him (all of which are listen in the Grandes Chronicles de France). He was refused a hearing; but since his accounts were correct, Louis was inclined to spare him anything more than banishment to the island of Cyprus. Charles of Valois then brought forward a charge of witchcraft which was more effectual. Enguerrand refused to defend himself before the court where the accuser was his own younger brother, bishop Jean de Marigny. He was condemned at once and hanged on the public gibbet of Montfaucon, protesting that in all his acts he had only been carrying out Philip's commands (30 April 1315). His body remained exposed on the gallows for two years, until 1317. After the request for a second trial by the new king Phillip V the Tall, freed him of the misdeeds attributed to him. His remains were then buried in the Carthusian church of Vauvert, which were then transferred to the church of Écouis, which was founded by Enguerrand himself near Rouen in 1313.

He was twice married, first to Jeanne de St Martin, by whom he had three children, Louis, Marie, and Isabelle (who married Robert, son of Robert de Tancarville); and the second time to Alips de Mons, with whom he had four other children, Isabelle, Alips, Raoul, and Thomas.

== In fiction ==
Marigny is thought to have been the inspiration for the conniving horse Fauvel in the Roman de Fauvel.

Marigny is a major character in Les Rois maudits (The Accursed Kings), a series of historical novels by Maurice Druon, which were adapted into a television miniseries in 1972 and again in 2005. He was portrayed by André Falcon in 1972 and by Jean-Claude Drouot in 2005.

Marigny is also referenced in the final chapter of The Hunchback of Notre-Dame as the first victim of Montfaucon, and a just man.
