= Jean de Marigny =

French Bishop (d. 1350)

His Excellency Jean de Marigny
- Archbishop of Rouen; Chancellor of France
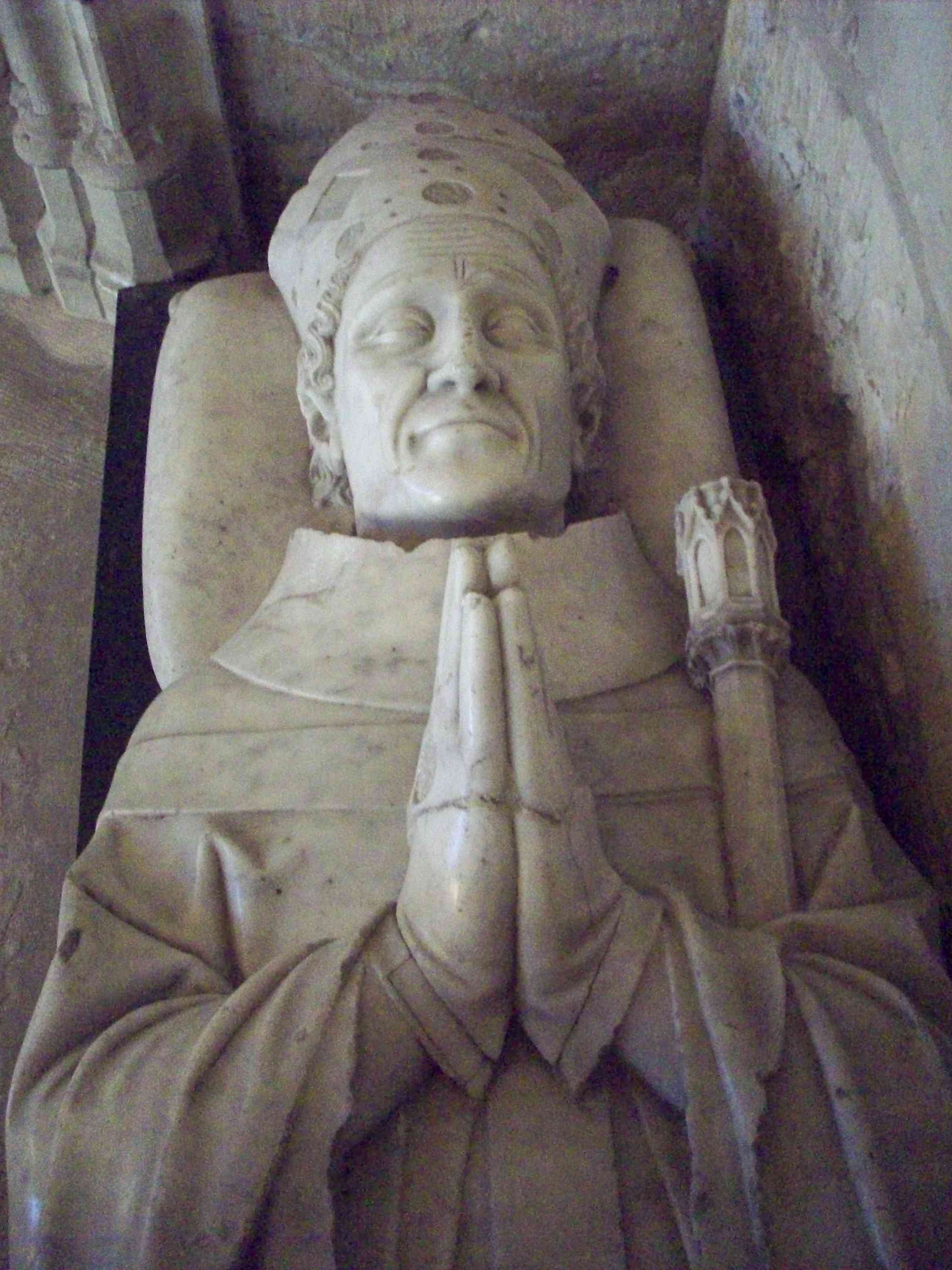
- Church: Catholic Church
- Archdiocese: Rouen
- Appointed: 14 May 1347
- Term ended: 26 December 1350
- Predecessor: Simon of Clermont-Nesle
- Successor: Guillaume Bertrand
- Previous posts: Bishop of Beauvais (1313-1347)

Personal details
- Died: 26 December 1350 France

Jean de Marigny (died December 26, 1350), French bishop, was a younger brother of Enguerrand de Marigny.

== Biography ==
Entering the church at an early age, he was rapidly advanced until in 1313 he was made bishop of Beauvais. During the next twenty years he was one of the most notable of the members of the French episcopate, and was particularly in favour with King Philip VI.

He devoted himself in 1335 to the completion of the choir of Beauvais Cathedral, the enormous windows of which were filled with the richest glass. But this building activity, which has left one of the most notable Gothic monuments in Europe, was broken into by the Hundred Years' War.

Jean de Marigny, a successful administrator and man of affairs rather than a saintly churchman, was made one of the king's lieutenants in southern France in 1341 against the English invasion.

His most important military operation, however, was when in 1346 he successfully held out in Beauvais against a siege by the English, who had overrun the country up to the walls of the city. Created archbishop of Rouen in 1347 as a reward for this defence, he enjoyed his new honours only three years.

== In fiction ==
Marigny is a major character in Les Rois maudits (The Accursed Kings), a series of historical novels by Maurice Druon, which were adapted into two French television miniseries in 1972 and 2005. He was portrayed by René Roussel in 1972 and by Michel Hermon in 2005.
