= Hélène Duc =

French actress

- Duc on the set of Edward and Caroline in 1951
- Born: Marcelle Geneviève Hélène Duc; 22 March 1917; Bergerac, Dordogne, France
- Died: 23 November 2014 (aged 97); Paris, France
- Occupation: Actress
- Years active: 1944–2005
- Spouse: René Catroux
- Children: 2

Marcelle Geneviève Hélène Duc (22 March 1917 – 23 November 2014), known professionally as Hélène Duc, was a French actress. She appeared in Edward and Caroline (1951), Je sais rien, mais je dirai tout (1973), and Tanguy (2001).

Duc played the role of Mahaut, Countess of Artois in the 1972 miniseries Les Rois maudits, and later played Marguerite de Bouville in the 2005 adaptation of the same novels.

In 1983, she performed at the Théâtre de la Gaîté-Montparnasse in a production of Chienne Dactylographe. She was named an officer of the Legion of Honour and Righteous Among the Nations in 2005.

Duc was married to René Catroux, with whom she had two daughters.

== Partial filmography ==
- 1945: Paris Frills as Une employée de la maison de couture (uncredited)
- 1951: Edward and Caroline as L'invitée mélomane
- 1952: The Happiest of Men as L'avocate mondaine
- 1955: The Grand Maneuver as La préfète (uncredited)
- 1959: Picnic on the Grass as Isabelle
- 1960: Le caïd as Edmée
- 1962: How to Succeed in Love as La femme du directeur des Editions du Soleil
- 1964: Male Hunt as Madame Armande
- 1965: Les baratineurs as Marie-Louise du Portail
- 1966: Les malabars sont au parfum as Tante Berthe
- 1968: À tout casser as La bourgeoise
- 1972–1973: Les Rois maudits (TV miniseries) as Mahaut, Countess of Artois
- 1973: La femme en bleu
- 1973: Je sais rien, mais je dirai tout as Mme Gastié-Leroy
- 1975: Le faux-cul as Mamy
- 1975: Catherine & Co.
- 1982: Toutes griffes dehors (TV Mini-Series, directed by Michel Boisrond)
- 1987: Miss Mona as The Mother
- 1987: Promis... juré! as Bonne Maman
- 1997: Les Soeurs Soleil as La dame chez le vétérinaire
- 2001: Un ange as Natacha
- 2001: Tanguy as Odile Guetz
- 2003: Laisse tes mains sur mes hanches (directed by Chantal Lauby) as Mme Tatin
- 2005: Les Rois maudits (TV miniseries) as Marguerite de Bouville
- 2007: Souffrance as Annie (final film role)
