= Mathieu III de Trie =

French military and political leader

Mathieu III de Trie (died 26 November 1344) was a 14th-century French military and political leader. He was the lord of Araines, Fontenay, and Vaumain, as well as being the 27th Marshal of France.

Sigil of the House de Trie.

Mathieu was born as the heir to House de Trie in France. His father Renaud de Trie was a prominent member of the nobility and his younger brother Guillaume de Trie was the archbishop of Reims.

In 1302 Mathieu led the French eighth bataille at the Battle of Courtrai. During this engagement his father Renaud was killed, leaving Mathieu to inherit his titles. From 1318 to 1320 he served as the Mashal of France, and in 1322 he was tasked with planning the coronation of Charles IV of France. He commanded an intervention in Guyencourt-sur-Noye and in 1325 led a Corps during the Peasant revolt in Flanders.

His notoriety greatly increased after his younger brother Guillaume de Trie crowned Philip VI of France. Mathieu headed a coalition of Norman lords to support a French conquest of England, and personally pledged 44,000 men to the venture. He commanded a French army in Flanders in 1339 and was the commander of the French garrison of Tournai during the first years of the Hundred Years' War. He appointed Lieutenant General of the Flemish frontier in 1342.

Mathieu de Trie died on 26 November 1345. He produced no heirs.
