= Béatrice d'Hirson =

French lady-in-waiting

Béatrice d'Hirson (fl. 14th century) was a lady-in-waiting to the French noblewoman Mahaut, Countess of Artois.

== In fiction ==
Although an obscure historical figure, Béatrice is an important character in Maurice Druon's series of French historical novels, Les Rois maudits (The Accursed Kings). In the novels, she practices witchcraft and is adept with poisons; she is claimed to have helped her mistress Mahaut poison two French kings, and then gone on to poison Mahaut herself.

Les Rois maudits was adapted into two French television miniseries in 1972 and 2005, and Béatrice was played by Catherine Rouvel in the 1972, and by Jeanne Balibar in 2005.
