= The Accursed Kings =

Series of historical novels by French author Maurice Druon

- Le Roi de fer (Book 1) 1955 French hardcover
- 1. Le Roi de fer (1955); 2. La Reine étranglée (1955); 3. Les Poisons de la couronne (1956); 4. La Loi des mâles (1957); 5. La Louve de France (1959); 6. Le Lis et le lion (1960); 7. Quand un Roi perd la France (1977)
- Author: Maurice Druon
- Country: France
- Language: French
- Genre: Historical fiction
- Publisher: Del Duca/Plon
- Published: 1955–1977
- Media type: Print

The Accursed Kings (French: Les Rois maudits [le ʁwa mo.di]) is a series of seven historical novels by French author Maurice Druon about the French monarchy in the 14th century. Published between 1955 and 1977, the series has been adapted as a miniseries twice for television in France. A new adaptation for film was announced to be in development in late 2024.

American author George R. R. Martin called The Accursed Kings "the original game of thrones", citing Druon's novels as an inspiration for his own series A Song of Ice and Fire.

== Plot ==
Set in the 14th century during the reigns of the last five kings of the direct Capetian dynasty and the first two kings of the House of Valois, the series begins as the French king Philip the Fair, already surrounded by scandal and intrigue, brings a curse upon his family when he persecutes the Knights Templar. The succession of monarchs that follows leads France and England to the Hundred Years' War.

== Characters ==
- Philip the Fair, the King of France
- Louis, King of Navarre, his eldest son
- Marguerite, Queen of Navarre, Louis' wife
- Philippe, Count de Poitiers, Philip's second son
- Jeanne, Countess de Poitiers, Philippe's wife and Blanche's sister
- Charles, Count of La Marche, Louis and Philippe's younger brother
- Blanche of Burgundy, Charles' wife and Jeanne's sister
- Isabella, Queen of England, Philip's daughter, called the "She-Wolf of France"
- Robert of Artois, Lord of Conches and Count of Beaumont-le-Roger
- Mahaut of Artois, Robert's aunt, and mother to Jeanne and Blanche
- Charles, Count of Valois, Philip's younger brother
- Louis, Count of Évreux, Philip's youngest brother
- Gautier d'Aunay, equerry to Philippe, Count of Poitiers, and lover of Blanche
- Philippe d'Aunay, equerry to Charles, Count of Valois, and lover of Marguerite
- Guillaume de Nogaret, Philip's prime councillor and keeper of the seal
- Enguerrand de Marigny, Philip's Chamberlain
- Hugues de Bouville, Philip's chamberlain
- Jacques de Molay, Grand Master of the Knights Templar
- Geoffroy de Charney, Templar Preceptor of Normandy
- Spinello Tolomei, a Siennese Lombard banker
- Guccio Baglioni, Tolomei's nephew
- Eliabel Cressay, widow of the Squire of Cressay
- Pierre and Jean Cressay, her sons
- Marie Cressay [fr], her daughter
- Jean de Marigny, Archbishop of Sens, younger brother of Enguerrand de Marigny
- Béatrice d'Hirson, first lady-in-waiting to the Countess Mahaut
- Lormet le Dolois, aide-de-camp to Robert of Artois
- Everard, Knight of the Order of Templars
- Jean de Longwy, nephew of Jacques de Molay
- Alain de Pareilles, Captain of the King's Archers
- Robert Bersumée, Captain of the fortress Château Gaillard
- Eudeline, servant with whom Louis has an affair and a daughter
- Clémence of Hungary, Louis' second wife
- Marie of Hungary, Queen of Naples, Clemence's grandmother
- Marguerite de Bouville, Hugues de Bouville's wife
- Gaucher V de Châtillon, the Constable of France
- Jacques Duèze, Cardinal who becomes Pope John XXII
- Thierry d'Hirson, canon and chancellor to Mahaut, Béatrice's uncle
- Philippe of Valois, son of Charles, Count of Valois
- Jeanne of Burgundy, Philippe of Valois' wife, and sister of Marguerite, Queen of Navarre and Eudes of Burgundy
- Eudes of Burgundy, brother of Marguerite and Jeanne of Burgundy
- Jean II, son of Philippe of Valois and Jeanne of Burgundy
- Edward II, King of England and Isabella's husband
- Roger Mortimer, 1st Earl of March, English baron and rebel
- Jeanne, Lady Mortimer, Mortimer's wife
- Hugh Despenser, lover and favourite of Edward II
- Eleanor, Lady Despenser, Despenser's wife
- Edmund, Earl of Kent, half-brother to Edward II and cousin to the French royal family
- Edmund Crouchback, uncle of Edward II
- Henry, 3rd Earl of Lancaster, son of Edmund Crouchback
- Edward III, son of Edward II and Isabella
- Philippa of Hainault, wife of Edward III and daughter of Guillaume, Count of Hainaut and Holland
- Adam Orleton, Bishop of Hereford and ally of Mortimer
- John Maltravers, longtime friend and supporter of Mortimer
- Jean of Hainaut, brother and general to Guillaume, Count of Hainaut and Holland
- Jeanne, Countess of Beaumont, Robert of Artois' wife, daughter of Charles of Valois
- Jeanne de Divion, former mistress of Thierry d'Hirson
- Roger Mortimer de Chirk, Mortimer's uncle
- Jacob van Artevelde, Flemish merchant befriended by Robert of Artois
- William Montacute, 1st Earl of Salisbury, longtime friend and supporter of Edward III
- Cola de Rienzi, self-declared tribune of Rome
- Hélie de Talleyrand-Périgord, French cardinal called "the Popemaker"

== Novels ==
1956 English 1st edition cover of The Iron King.

The first six novels of Les Rois maudits were published in France by Del Duca between 1955 and 1960, and the final volume was released by Plon in 1977. The initial six books were first issued in English (translated by Humphrey Hare) between 1956 and 1961, by Rupert Hart-Davis in the United Kingdom and by Scribner's in the United States, with periodic reprints through the 1980s. Between 2013 and 2015, HarperCollins reissued the entire series in print and audiobook, including the last instalment The King Without a Kingdom, which had never previously been published in English.

=== Book 1 – Le Roi de fer (1955) ===
(English title: The Iron King)

French King Philip the Fair rules with an iron fist, but is surrounded by scandal and intrigue. Philip's daughter Isabella, Queen of England, plots with the ambitious Robert of Artois to catch the wives of her three brothers—Marguerite, Jeanne and Blanche—in their suspected adulterous affairs. Robert's own motive is to avenge himself on Jeanne and Blanche's mother, his great-aunt Mahaut, Countess of Artois, who he believes has stolen his rightful inheritance. Philip's younger brother Charles, Count of Valois, resents the power and influence of the common-born Guillaume de Nogaret, Philip's prime councillor and keeper of the seal, and Enguerrand de Marigny, Philip's Chamberlain. When Philip's self-serving persecution of the Knights Templar ends with the Templar Grand Master Jacques de Molay being burned at the stake, Molay curses his accusers—Pope Clement V, Nogaret and Philip himself—to the 13th generation. Marguerite and Blanche are sentenced to life imprisonment for their crimes, and their lovers Gautier and Philippe d'Aunay are tortured and executed. Jeanne, innocent of adultery herself but complicit in the scandal, is imprisoned indefinitely. Forty days after Molay's execution, Clement dies of fever; shortly thereafter, Mahaut's lady-in-waiting Béatrice d'Hirson arranges for Nogaret's painful death by means of a poisoned candle. Philip fears that Molay's curse is to blame; soon enough, he suffers a cerebral hemorrhage and collapses during a hunt, and dies days later.

=== Book 2 – La Reine étranglée (1955) ===
(English title: The Strangled Queen)

Philip's eldest son has been crowned Louis X, but his adulterous wife Marguerite remains imprisoned at the Château Gaillard. Seeking to remarry and father a male heir, Louis sends Robert of Artois to compel Marguerite to sign a statement, in exchange for her freedom, that her marriage to Louis was never consummated and that her daughter Jeanne is illegitimate. She refuses, and Louis' plan to secure an annulment and marry the beautiful Clemence of Hungary is further stalled by the papal conclave's failure to elect a new pope. Marigny finds that his enemies—led by Charles, Count of Valois—are systematically excluding him from the new king's inner circle. Louis' brother, Philippe, Count de Poitiers, and Valois both try to assert some influence over the indecisive king, Philippe for the good of the kingdom and Valois for personal gain. Desperate for freedom, Marguerite reconsiders, but her "confession" never reaches Robert. When he returns to her prison, Marguerite is ill from her confinement—and on Valois' orders, Robert's man Lormet strangles her to death. Though his initial efforts to destroy Marigny fail, Valois manages—with the help of the Lombard banker Tolomei—to assemble a barrage of criminal charges that sees Marigny executed.

=== Book 3 – Les Poisons de la couronne (1956) ===
(English title: The Poisoned Crown; literally "The Poisons of the Crown")

Louis, now a widower, marries the beautiful Clemence of Hungary. Her discovery of his illegitimate daughter prompts Louis to confess all of his sins to her, and he swears to do whatever penance she requires. Mahaut and Béatrice use magic to assure that Philippe takes back his wife, Mahaut's daughter Jeanne, from her imprisonment. Louis' uncle Charles, Count of Valois, continues grasping for influence over royal affairs by trying to secure the allegiance of the new queen, his niece by his previous marriage. Tolomei's nephew, the young banker Guccio Baglioni, marries noblewoman Marie de Cressay in secret. With encouragement from Robert of Artois, Mahaut's vassal barons revolt against her. Louis is compelled to intervene, and strips her of power when she refuses to submit to his arbitration. Mahaut poisons Louis with Béatrice's help, and he dies, leaving behind a pregnant Clemence and the court in turmoil.

=== Book 4 – La Loi des mâles (1957) ===
(English title: The Royal Succession; literally "The Law of Males")

With Louis dead and Clemence pregnant, Louis' uncle Charles and brother Philippe plot against each other for the regency. Waiting in the wings is Marguerite's brother Eudes of Burgundy, who seeks to defend the rights of Louis and Marguerite's daughter Jeanne. Philippe outmaneuvers his rivals and assumes power. Having trapped the embattled cardinals together in Lyon, he forces a papal conclave that—with some subterfuge—elects Jacques Duèze as Pope Jean XXII. Marie de Cressay gives birth to Guccio's son in a convent, and within days Clemence gives birth to Louis' son Jean. With Clemence deathly ill, Hugues de Bouville and his clever wife Marguerite enlist Marie as wet nurse to the young king. The Countess Mahaut recognizes the infant Jean as the only obstacle between Philippe—who is married to her daughter Jeanne—and the French throne. Fearful of Mahaut, Hugues and Marguerite switch Jean with Marie's child Giannino when the baby king is presented to the barons by the countess. Poisoned by Mahaut, the infant dies almost immediately. Without direct proof of her guilt, and unsure of Philippe's involvement, the Bouvilles are compelled to keep their secret or possibly be implicated themselves. As Philippe secures his support and accedes the throne, the Bouvilles coerce a devastated Marie to raise Jean as her own and—as a means to keep the secret—never see Guccio again.

=== Book 5 – La Louve de France (1959) ===
(English title: The She-Wolf of France)

Louis and Philippe's younger brother Charles IV is now the French king. His sister Isabella is still married to the English King Edward II, whose open favour of his lover Hugh Despenser and the extended Despenser family has marginalized Isabella and incited rebellion among Edward's vassal barons. When rebel Baron Roger Mortimer escapes imprisonment in the Tower of London and flees to France to plot against Edward, Isabella later follows on the pretext of negotiating a treaty with her brother, and joins Mortimer as his lover and co-conspirator. A guilt-ridden Bouville finally admits the truth about the French boy king to Pope Jean, whose link to Philippe encourages him to keep the secret. Mahaut seeks her revenge against Isabella—now popularly called the "She-Wolf of France"—by plotting her expulsion from France and certain death at Edward's hands. However, aided by forces from Holland and Edward's own dissenting barons, Mortimer and Isabella invade England and depose Edward in favor of his and Isabella's son Edward III. The daughter and wife of kings, Isabella does not want to give the order to have the elder Edward killed, but a jealous and petulant Mortimer forces her hand, and his minions brutally murder the imprisoned and humiliated former king, following Hugh Despenser's trial and most cruel execution.

=== Book 6 – Le Lis et le lion (1960) ===
(English title: The Lily and the Lion)

Charles dies and is succeeded by his cousin Philippe of Valois, thanks in no small part to the machinations of Robert of Artois. In England, young Edward III has married Philippa of Hainaut and the problems within the regency begin to compound just as he is about to come of age. Mortimer begins to overstep his authority over the various members of the royal family in front of him, mainly regency council president Henry, Earl of Lancaster. After Mortimer orchestrates the extrajudicial execution of Edward's uncle Edmund, Earl of Kent behind his and Lancaster's backs, Edward reclaims the throne and has Mortimer executed. With Philippe in his debt, Robert reopens his claim on Artois, but is forced to forge documents that Mahaut has destroyed. In love with Robert and excited by danger, Béatrice poisons Mahaut, and then her daughter Jeanne, to aid Robert's cause. When his case unravels, Robert refuses Philippe's offer of a quiet defeat, and is subsequently implicated in a lifetime of crimes. Now a fugitive and outlaw, Robert spends years wandering Europe before he seeks out Edward. Convincing the English king to make his claim on the French throne with force, Robert is killed in battle just as campaign is picking up speed. Twelve years later, Giannino Baglioni is summoned to Rome by the self-declared tribune Cola de Rienzi, who reveals to the Sienese banker that Giannino is actually Jean I, the rightful King of France. Rienzi's murder, however, thwarts Jean's bid for the throne, and he eventually dies in captivity in Naples, the last direct victim of the curse inflicted upon Philippe's house. The epilogue to the novel suggests, however, that the curse would reverberate over the House of Valois and France itself until the burning of Joan of Arc in Rouen a century after the main events of the novel.

=== Book 7 – Quand un Roi perd la France (1977) ===
(English title: The King Without a Kingdom; literally "When A King Loses France")

Cardinal Talleyrand-Périgord recounts the troubled reign of Philippe's son, Jean II "The Good", who continues the reversal of fortune for France set in motion by his father. Jean creates discord among his lords by the disproportionate favour he bestows upon the handsome Charles de La Cerda, whose subsequent murder ignites a bitter feud between Jean and his treacherous son-in-law, Charles, King of Navarre. Encouraged by the Navarese and taking advantage of the turmoil in France, Edward III renews his claim to the French throne. His son, Edward, the Black Prince, mounts a relatively small but largely unchecked invasion of France. Finally confronted by Jean's forces, which vastly outnumber his, young Edward still manages to turn the tables and defeat the French, capturing Jean, his youngest son Philippe and many of his great lords.

== Adaptations ==
The Accursed Kings
Les Rois maudits
- Genre: Historical miniseries
- Based on: Les Rois maudits by Maurice Druon
Year	1972	2005
Screenplay by	Marcel Jullian	Anne-Marie Catois
Directed by	Claude Barma	Josée Dayan
Starring	Jean Piat; Hélène Duc	Philippe Torreton; Jeanne Moreau
Composer(s)	Georges Delerue	Bruno Coulais
Country of origin	France	France
Original language(s)	French	French
No. of episodes	6	5
Production
Cinematography	Pierre Mareschal	Ennio Guarnieri
Running time	616 minutes	500 minutes
Release
Original channel	ORTF	France 2
Original debut	21 December 1972	7 November 2005
Original end	24 January 1973	28 November 2005

Les Rois maudits has been adapted twice for French television. In December 2024, a new adaptation for film was announced.

=== 1972 miniseries ===
The 1972 TV adaptation of Les Rois maudits was broadcast by the ORTF from 21 December 1972 to 24 January 1973, and starred Jean Piat as Robert d'Artois and Hélène Duc as Mahaut d'Artois. Adapted by Marcel Jullian and directed by Claude Barma, its six episodes were directly based on—and named after—the first six novels in Druon's series. Dubbed "the French I, Claudius", the series was "hugely successful", and brought the novels "from cult to mainstream success". The production was shot in studio, with minimal sets. Bertrand Guyard of Le Figaro praised the production and cast in 2013. The series was broadcast in the United Kingdom by the BBC in French with English subtitles in June–July 1974 and again in August–September 1975.

=== 2005 miniseries ===
In 2005, Les Rois maudits was again adapted in a joint French-Italian production directed by Josée Dayan, starring Philippe Torreton as Robert and Jeanne Moreau as Mahaut. Broadcast on France 2 from 7 November to 28 November 2005, its five episodes are named after novels 1–3 and 5–6 (the exception being La Loi des mâles). The series premiered with 8.6 million viewers, and the finale garnered over 6.2 million viewers. Overall Les Rois maudits averaged 7.2 million viewers, an audience share of 27.9%.

The miniseries was nominated for a 2006 Globes de Cristal Award for Best Television Film or Television Series.

=== Upcoming film series ===
In late 2024, newly formed distribution company Yapluka announced that they were developing the novels for film as their first project. The team behind the series consists of the writing/directing partnership of Matthieu Delaporte and Alexandre de La Patellièr while producer Dimitri Rassam heads up the business side. Rassam described this project as a long-term dream for himself as well Delaporte and de La Patellièr that became a reality after the success of their recent collaboration on The Count of Monte Cristo (2024).

Rassam stated in an interview in May 2025 that The Iron King (the first film) will have a budget of approximately $80 million, which will make it the most expensive French film since 2017's Valerian and the City of a Thousand Planets. In the same interview Rassam disclosed that the films will be produced in English instead of French as a budget-offsetting measure to widen the potential audience and to be able to attract more recognizable and marketable actors. Originally announced as a 2026 production, the film will now shoot in 2027 to give the team more time to finalize the script.

Pierre Niney, another frequent collaborator with the team at Yapluka, is the only known actor involved with the series. He was named in the original late 2024 announcement but his specific role was not disclosed.

== Reception ==
According to John Lichfield, The Independent's French correspondent and a friend of Druon's, "Les Rois maudits was written to make money very quickly ... [Druon] himself was not very proud of it." However the series was "popular and critically praised", and numbered among Druon's best-known works. Lichfield noted:

Les Rois maudits (The Accursed Kings) was one of the few works of contemporary western literature to be published in Russian in the Soviet Union in the 1960s. Thus, the playful, arch-conservative Maurice Druon, not the dour and radical Jean-Paul Sartre or Albert Camus, became the voice of France to Russian bibliophiles, including the young Vladimir Putin. When Putin became president of Russia, he started an unlikely friendship with his literary hero.

In his youth, Druon had cowritten the lyrics to Chant des Partisans (1943), a popular French Resistance anthem of World War II. In 1948 he received the Prix Goncourt for his novel Les Grandes Familles. Though Ben Milne of the BBC noted in 2014 that Druon is "barely known in the English-speaking world", American author George R. R. Martin called the author "France's best historical novelist since Alexandre Dumas, père". Martin dubbed The Accursed Kings "the original game of thrones", citing Druon's novels as an inspiration for his own series A Song of Ice and Fire. Martin's UK publisher HarperCollins began reissuing the long out of print Accursed Kings series in 2013, with Martin himself writing an introduction. He wrote:

The Accursed Kings has it all. Iron kings and strangled queens, battles and betrayals, lies and lust, deception, family rivalries, the curse of the Templars, babies switched at birth, she-wolves, sin, and swords, the doom of a great dynasty … and all of it (well, most of it) straight from the pages of history. And believe me, the Starks and the Lannisters have nothing on the Capets and Plantagenets.

Writing for The Wall Street Journal, Allan Massie praised Druon's "thorough research, depth of understanding and popular touch", noting that "Druon’s re-creation of medieval Paris is so vivid that it loses nothing in comparison with the evocation of the city in the greatest of French medievalist novels, Victor Hugo’s Notre-Dame de Paris". Massie added:

There are murders galore in these books—one queen is strangled, one king poisoned and another thought to be poisoned while still a baby at his christening. There is skulduggery, conspiracy and civil war. There are men of great ability and few scruples, and scarcely a page without dramatic incident ... The characters are impressive, but few are admirable. Almost the only likeable one is the young Siennese banker Guccio—and bankers are important figures in the novels, for Druon never lets us forget that even in his world of kings, barons and knights, it is money that rules, money that oils the wheels of war and politics ... The novels are not recommended to the squeamish, but anyone with strong nerves will delight in them. Few figures in literature are as terrible as the Countess Mahaut, murderer and maker of kings.

In 2013, Stefan Raets suggested that The Iron King could be considered a grimdark historical novel. In a 2013 Booklist Starred Review, David Pitt called the novel "historical fiction on a grand scale, full of political intrigue, family drama, and characters who, while drawn from life, are larger than it". Russell Miller wrote for Library Journal:

Adding to the intrigue is Druon's marvelous depiction of the swirl of those lives that move around him ... Seasoned with sex, betrayal, brutal warfare, cold pragmatic calculating, and curses from the lips of martyrs dying at the stake, this tale cuts a memorable swath through the reader's imagination. The flavor of the times, the smells, sounds, values, and superstitions give this work a fine readability as well as a sensation of reality.

The Sunday Times called The Iron King "dramatic and colourful as a Dumas romance but stiffened by historical accuracy and political insight" and a "blood-curdling tale of intrigue, murder, corruption and sexual passion". The Times Literary Supplement described it as "Dramatic, highly coloured, barbaric, sensual, teeming with life, based in wide reading and sound scholarship" and "among the best historical novels of recent years".

Les Rois maudits was parodied on French television in the successful 1973 series Les Maudits Rois fainéants (The Damned Lazy Kings) starring Roger Pierre and Jean-Marc Thibault.
