= Mahaut of Artois =

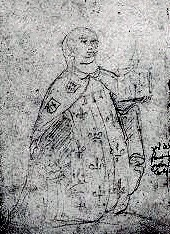

Countess of Artois
- Reign: 11 July 1302 – 27 November 1329
- Predecessor: Robert II
- Successor: Joan II
- Born: c. 1268; Prob. Artois, France
- Died: 27 November 1329 (aged 60–61); Paris, Île-de-France, France
- Burial: Maubuisson Abbey, near Saint-Ouen-l'Aumône
- Spouse: Otto IV, Count of Burgundy (m. 1285; died 1303)
- Issue: Joan, Queen of France; Blanche, Queen of France; Robert of Burgundy
- House: Artois
- Father: Robert II, Count of Artois
- Mother: Amicie of Courtenay

Mahaut of Artois also known as Mathilda (1268 – 27 November 1329), ruled as Countess of Artois from 1302 to 1329. She was furthermore regent of the County of Burgundy from 1303 to 1315 during the minority and the absence of her daughter, Joan II, Countess of Burgundy.

== Biography ==
=== Early life ===
She was the eldest child (and only daughter) of Robert II, Count of Artois, and Amicie of Courtenay. Her paternal grandparents were Robert I, Count of Artois, and Matilda of Brabant. Her maternal grandparents were Pierre de Courtenay, Seigneur de Conches, and Perronelle de Joigny. She was the sister of Philip of Artois (1269–1298) and Robert of Artois (born 1271).

In 1291, Mahaut married Otto IV, Count of Burgundy. She became the mother of three children, including two girls who married kings of France.

=== Rule in Artois ===
Because of the premature death of her brother Philip in 1298, she inherited the County of Artois at her father's death in 1302, rather than her nephew Robert III (her inheritance being based upon proximity of blood). Although he repeatedly challenged the decision, her rights to the county were consistently upheld by the Parlement of Paris and the royal court. She was an able administrator and managed to defeat the many rebellions perpetrated by members of the nobility. Her senior administrator was the Bishop of the Roman Catholic Diocese of Arras, Thierry de Hérisson.

=== Regency in Burgundy ===
Upon his death in 1303, her spouse, Otto, was succeeded by their daughter Joan II, Countess of Burgundy in the County of Burgundy. Since Joan II was under age, Mahaut acted as Joan’s regent during her minority. When Joan II married the future Philip V of France in 1307, Mahaut continued to rule the domains of her absent daughter until 1315.

=== Accusations of Witchcraft ===
In 1316, driven by claims from the slighted Robert III, Mahaut was accused of bewitching Phillip V and poisoning Louis X. Following the Tour de Nesle scandal, where Joan II was temporarily incarcerated on grounds of not revealing the adultery of her sisters, Phillip was said to have grown estranged from his wife. The threat of repudiation would put the humiliated Mahaut's social position in jeopardy, while hastening the succession helped guarantee that her daughter's husband - then regent - would ascend to the throne.

=== Death ===
Upon the death of Mahaut in 1329, the county of Artois was inherited by her daughter Joan.

== Issue ==
- Joan II, Countess of Burgundy (c.1291–1330), married Philip V of France
- Blanche of Burgundy (c.1296–1326), married Charles IV of France
- Robert of Burgundy (c.1300–1317).

Mahaut's daughters Joan II and Blanche, along with their cousin Margaret of Burgundy, all future queens of France, were implicated in the Tour de Nesle affair.

== In fiction ==
Mahaut is a major character in Les Rois maudits (The Accursed Kings), a series of historical novels by Maurice Druon. Druon describes her as the poisoner of Louis X and his infant son Jean I, who is later poisoned herself the same way by her lady-in-waiting Béatrice d'Hirson, who originally helped with the King's poisoning. Allan Massie wrote in The Wall Street Journal, "Few figures in literature are as terrible as the Countess Mahaut, murderer and maker of kings." She was portrayed by Hélène Duc in the 1972 French miniseries adaptation of the novels, and by Jeanne Moreau in the 2005 remake.

== Bibliography ==
- Cox, Eugene (1999). "The kingdoms of Burgundy, the lands of the house of Savoy and adjacent territories". In Abulafia, David (ed.). The New Cambridge Medieval History: Volume 5, C.1198-c.1300. Cambridge University Press.
- Dunbabin, Jean (2011). The French in the Kingdom of Sicily, 1266–1305. Cambridge University Press.
- Sample, Dana L. (2008). Villalon, L.J. Andrew; Kagay, Donald J. (eds.). Philip VI's Mortal Enemy: Robert of Artois and the Beginning of the Hundred Years War, The Hundred Years War (Part II): Different Vistas. Brill.
- Small, Carola M. (1990). "Messengers in the County of Artois, 1295-1329". Canadian Journal of History. 25 (2): 163–175. doi:10.3138/cjh.25.2.163. Archived from the original on 29 July 2013.
- Wood, Charles T. (1966). The French Apanages and the Capetian Monarchy, 1224-1328. Harvard University Press.

Mahaut of Artois House of Artois Cadet branch of the Capetian dynasty Born: 1268 Died: 28 October 1329
French nobility
Preceded by Robert II	Countess of Artois; 1302–1329	Succeeded by Joan II
