= Maurice Druon =

French writer and scholar (1918–2009)

Maurice Druon KBE
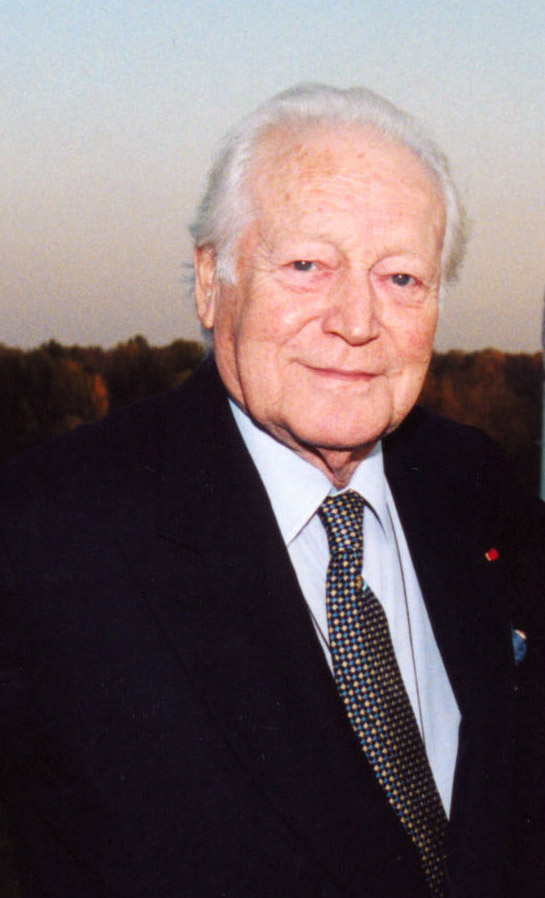
- Druon in 2003
- Born: 23 April 1918; Paris, France
- Died: 14 April 2009 (aged 90); Paris, France
- Occupation: Novelist
- Spouses: Geneviève Gregh (m. 1938; div. 1954) Madeleine Marignac (m. 1968)
- Writing career
- Period: 1942–2009
- Notable awards: • Grand Cross Legion of Honour • Ordre des Arts et des Lettres • Knight Commander of the Order of the British Empire • Prix Goncourt • Commemorative medal for voluntary service in Free France

Minister of Culture
- In office 5 April 1973 – 27 February 1974
- President: Georges Pompidou
- Prime Minister: Pierre Messmer
- Preceded by: Jacques Duhamel
- Succeeded by: Alain Peyrefitte

Member of the National Assembly for Paris's 22nd constituency
- In office 3 April 1978 – 22 May 1981
- Preceded by: Bernard Lafay
- Succeeded by: Bernard Pons

Maurice Druon (French pronunciation: [mɔʁis dʁyɔ̃]; 23 April 1918 – 14 April 2009) was a French novelist and a member of the Académie Française, of which he served as "Perpetual Secretary" (chairman) between 1985 and 1999.

== Life and career ==
Born in Paris, France, Druon was the son of Russian-Jewish immigrant Lazare Kessel (1899–1920) and was brought up at La Croix-Saint-Leufroy in Normandy and educated at the lycée Michelet de Vanves. His father committed suicide in 1920 and his mother remarried in 1926; Maurice subsequently took the name of his adoptive father, the lawyer René Druon (1874–1961).

He was the nephew of the writer Joseph Kessel, with whom he translated the "Chant des Partisans", a French Resistance anthem of World War II, with music and words (in Russian) originally by Anna Marly. Druon was a member of the Resistance and came to London in 1943 to participate in the BBC's "Honneur et Patrie" programme.

Druon began writing for literary journals at the age of 18. In September 1939, having been called up for military service, he wrote an article for Paris-Soir entitled "J'ai vingt ans et je pars (I am twenty years old and I am leaving)". Following the fall of France in 1940, he was demobilized and remained in the unoccupied zone of France, and his first play, Mégarée, was produced in Monte Carlo in February 1942. He left the same year to join the forces of Charles de Gaulle. Druon became aide de camp to General François d'Astier de La Vigerie.

In 1948 Druon received the Prix Goncourt for his novel Les Grandes Familles, and later published two sequels.

Druon was elected to the 30th seat of the Académie française on 8 December 1966, succeeding Georges Duhamel. He was elected as "Perpetual Secretary" in 1985, but chose to resign the office in late 1999 due to old age; he successfully pushed for Hélène Carrère d'Encausse to succeed him, the first woman to hold the post, and was styled Honorary Perpetual Secretary after 2000. On the death of Henri Troyat on 2 March 2007, he became the Dean of the Académie, its longest-serving member.

While his scholarly writing earned him a seat at the Académie, Druon is best known for a series of seven historical novels published in the 1950s under the title Les Rois maudits (The Accursed Kings). The novels were adapted for French television in 1972, gaining a wider audience through overseas sales, and again in 2005, starring Jeanne Moreau. A third adaptation, this time for film, was announced to be in development in late 2024, with plans for The Iron King (the first film) to begin production in 2027. Fantasy writer George R. R. Martin stated that the novels had been an inspiration for his fantasy series A Song of Ice and Fire, and called Druon "France's best historical novelist since Alexandre Dumas, père".

Druon's only work for children – Tistou les pouces verts – was published in 1957 and translated into English in 1958 (as Tistou of the Green Thumbs) and 2012 (as Tistou: The Boy With Green Thumbs).

Druon was Minister of Cultural Affairs (1973–1974) in Pierre Messmer's cabinet, and a deputy for Paris's 22nd constituency (1978–1981). He was survived by his second wife, Madeleine Marignac, whom he married in 1968. Madeleine Druon died in 2016 aged 91.

== Les Rois maudits (The Accursed Kings) ==
The titles from the individual Scribner English editions as published in the United States are given below, as well as the literal English translations of the original French titles.

| # | French title | Year | Translation | Scribner title |
|---|---|---|---|---|
| 1 | Le Roi de fer | 1955 | "The King of Iron" | The Iron King |
| 2 | La Reine étranglée | 1955 | "The Strangled Queen" | The Strangled Queen |
| 3 | Les Poisons de la couronne | 1956 | "The Poisons of the Crown" | The Poisoned Crown |
| 4 | La Loi des mâles | 1957 | "The Law of Males" | The Royal Succession |
| 5 | La Louve de France | 1959 | "The She-Wolf of France" | The She-Wolf of France |
| 6 | Le Lys et le lion | 1960 | "The Lily and the Lion" | The Lily and the Lion |
| 7 | Quand un Roi perd la France | 1977 | "When a King Loses France" | The King Without a Kingdom |

== Bibliography ==
- Mégarée, pièce en trois actes, créée au Grand Théâtre de Monte-Carlo (1942)
- Le Sonneur de bien aller (1943 — novella)
- Préface d'un chameau en pyjame (1943)
- Le Chant des Partisans (with Joseph Kessel, 1943)
- Lettres d’un Européen, essai (1944)
- La Dernière Brigade, roman (1946)
- Ithaque délivrée, poème dramatique traduit de l’anglais; d’après The Rescue d’Edward Sackville-West (1947)
- Les Grandes Familles (1948)
- La Chute des corps (Les Grandes Familles, II, 1950)
- Rendez-vous aux enfers (Les Grandes Familles, III, 1951)
- Remarques (1952)
- Un voyageur, comédie en un acte, au répertoire de la Comédie française (1953)
- Le Coup de grâce, mélodrame en trois actes (with Joseph Kessel, 1953)
- La Volupté d’être, roman (1954)
- La Reine étranglée (Les Rois maudits, II, 1955)
- Le Roi de fer (Les Rois maudits, I, 1955)
- Les Poisons de la couronne (Les Rois maudits, III, 1956)
- L'Hôtel de Mondez, nouvelle (1956)
- La Loi des mâles (Les Rois maudits, IV, 1957)
- Tistou les pouces verts (1957)
- Alexandre le Grand (1958)
- La Louve de France (Les Rois maudits, V, 1959)
- Le Lis et le lion (Les Rois maudits, VI, 1960)
- Des Seigneurs de la plaine à l’hôtel de Mondez (1962 — Short story collection)
- Théâtre — Mégarée, Un voyageur, La Contessa (1962)
- Les Mémoires de Zeus (1963)
- Bernard Buffet, essai (1964 — Essay)
- Paris, de César à Saint Louis (1964 — Historical essay)
- Le Pouvoir, notes et maximes (1965)
- Les Tambours de la mémoire (1965)
- Les Rois maudits, roman historique (6 volumes, 1966)
- Les Mémoires de Zeus, II, roman historique (1967)
- Le Bonheur des uns, nouvelles (1967)
- Vézelay, colline éternelle (1968)
- L'Avenir en désarroi, essai (1968)
- Grandeur et signification de Leningrad (1968)
- Lettres d’un Européen et Nouvelles Lettres d’un Européen, 1943–1970 (1970 — essay)
- Splendeur provençale (1970)
- Une Église qui se trompe de siècle (1972)
- La Parole et le Pouvoir (1974)
- Œuvres complètes (25 volumes with unpublished material, 1977)
- Quand un roi perd la France (Les Rois maudits, VII, 1977)
- Attention la France ! (1981)
- Réformer la démocratie (1982)
- La Culture et l’État (1985)
- Vézelay, colline éternelle, nouvelle édition (1987)
- Lettre aux Français sur leur langue et leur âme (1994)
- Circonstances (1997)
- Circonstances politiques, 1954–1974 (1998)
- Le bon français (1999)
- Circonstances politiques II, 1974–1998 (1999)
- La France aux ordres d’un cadavre (2000)
- Ordonnances pour un État malade (2002)
- Le Franc-parler (2003)
- Mémoires. L'aurore vient du fond du ciel (2006)
- Les mémoires de Zeus (2007)

== Honours ==
- Grand Cross of the Legion of Honour
- Commander of the Order of Arts and Letters
- Médaille de la France libre
- Honorary Knight Commander of the Order of the British Empire (KBE)
- Grand Officer of Merit of the Sovereign Military Order of Malta
- Commandor in the Order of the Phoenix
- Knight Grand Cross in the Order of Merit of the Italian Republic
- Knight Grand Cross in the Order of the Aztec Eagle
- Grand Officer in the Order of the Lion of Senegal
- Knight Grand Cross in the Military Order of Christ
- Knight officer in the Order of May.

=== Awards ===
- Honorary Doctorates from York University (Toronto), Boston University (USA) and the University of Tirana (Albania)
- Prix Goncourt (The Rise of Simon Lachaume, 1948)
- Literary Award of the Foundation of Prince Pierre de Monaco (for lifetime achievement, 1966)
- Prix Saint-Simon (Circumstances, 1998)
- Prize Agrippa d'Aubigné (The Good French, 2000)
- Order of Friendship, 1993 (Russia)

== Gallery ==
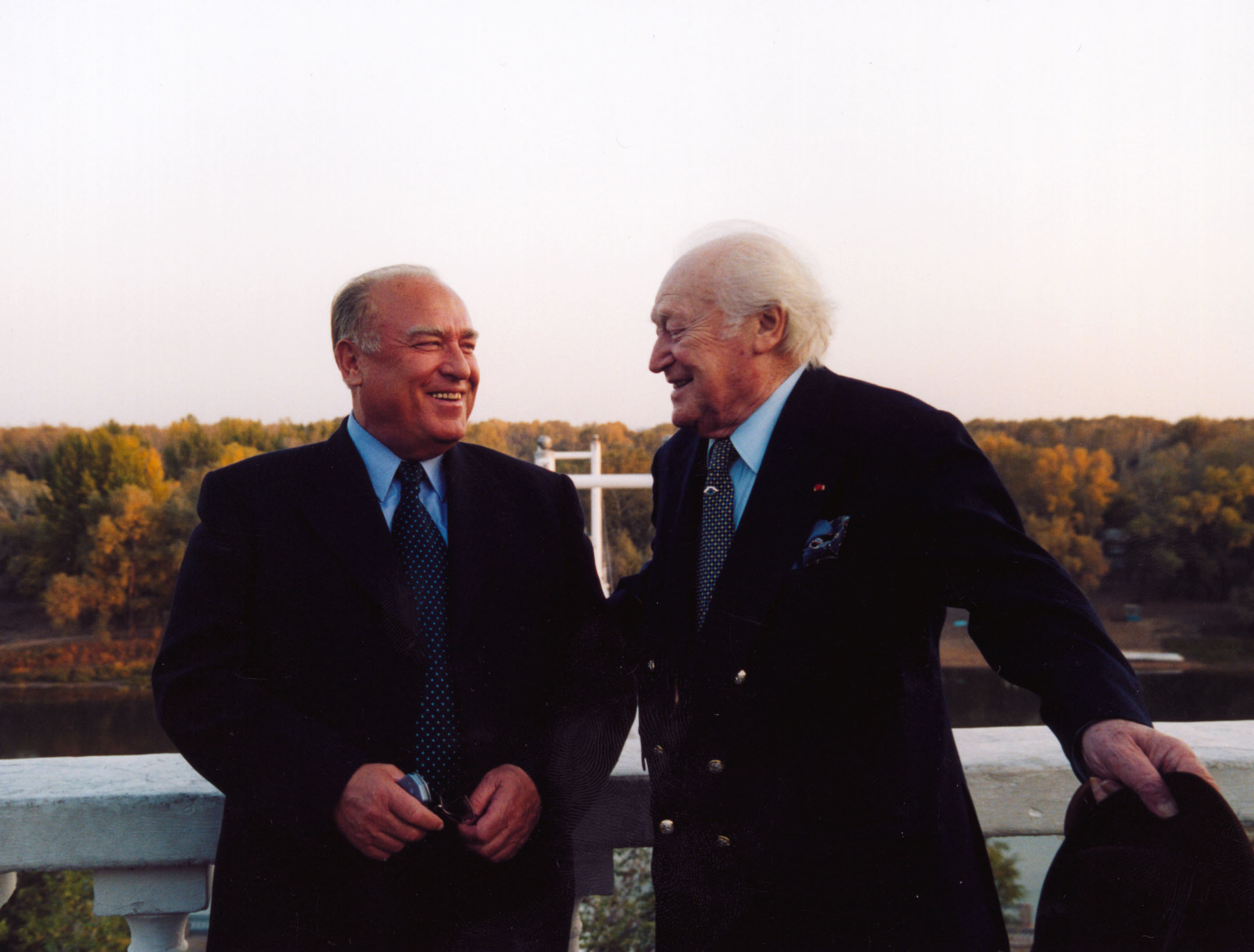
Maurice Druon in Orenburg in Russia in 2003.

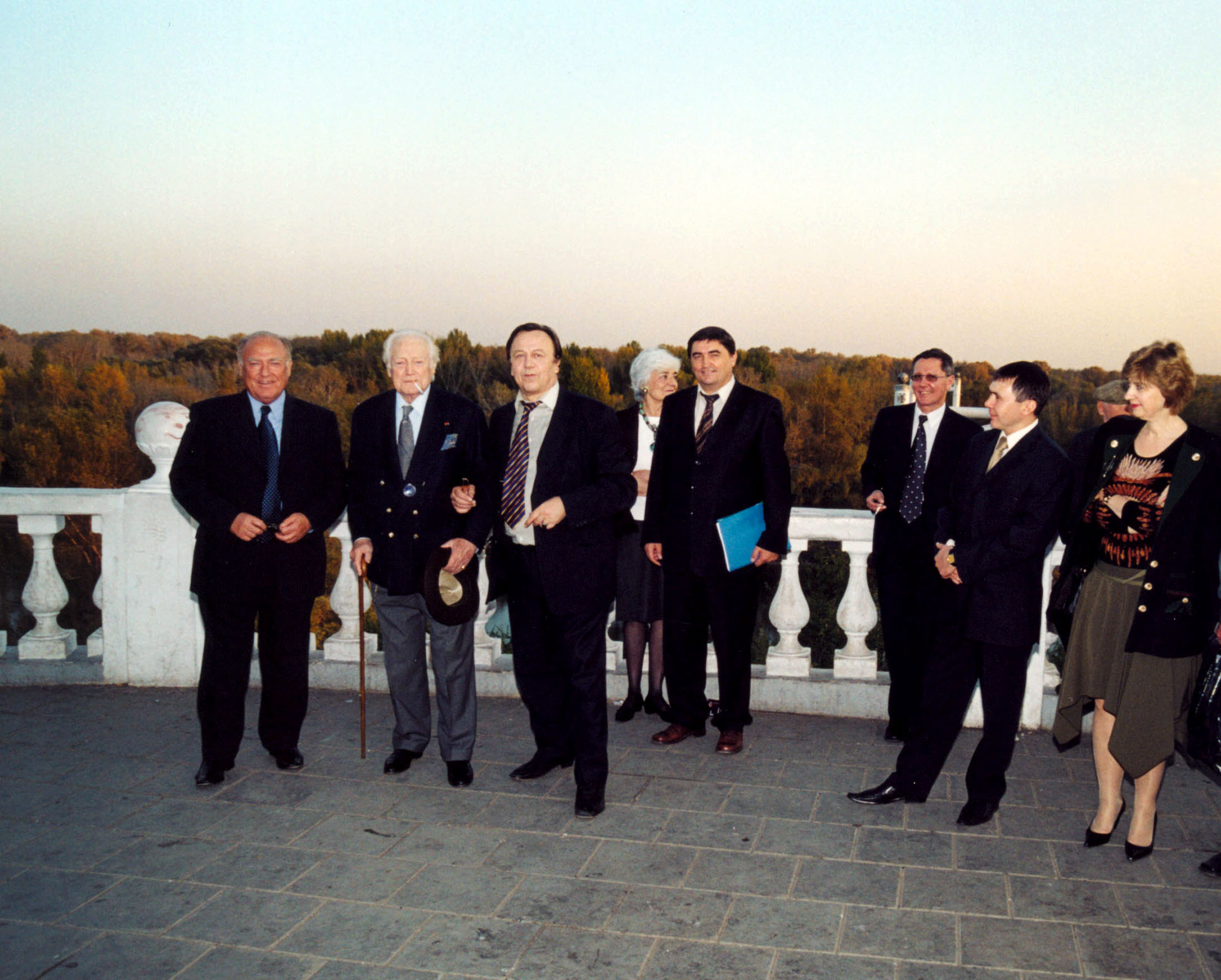
Maurice Druon in Orenburg, 2003.

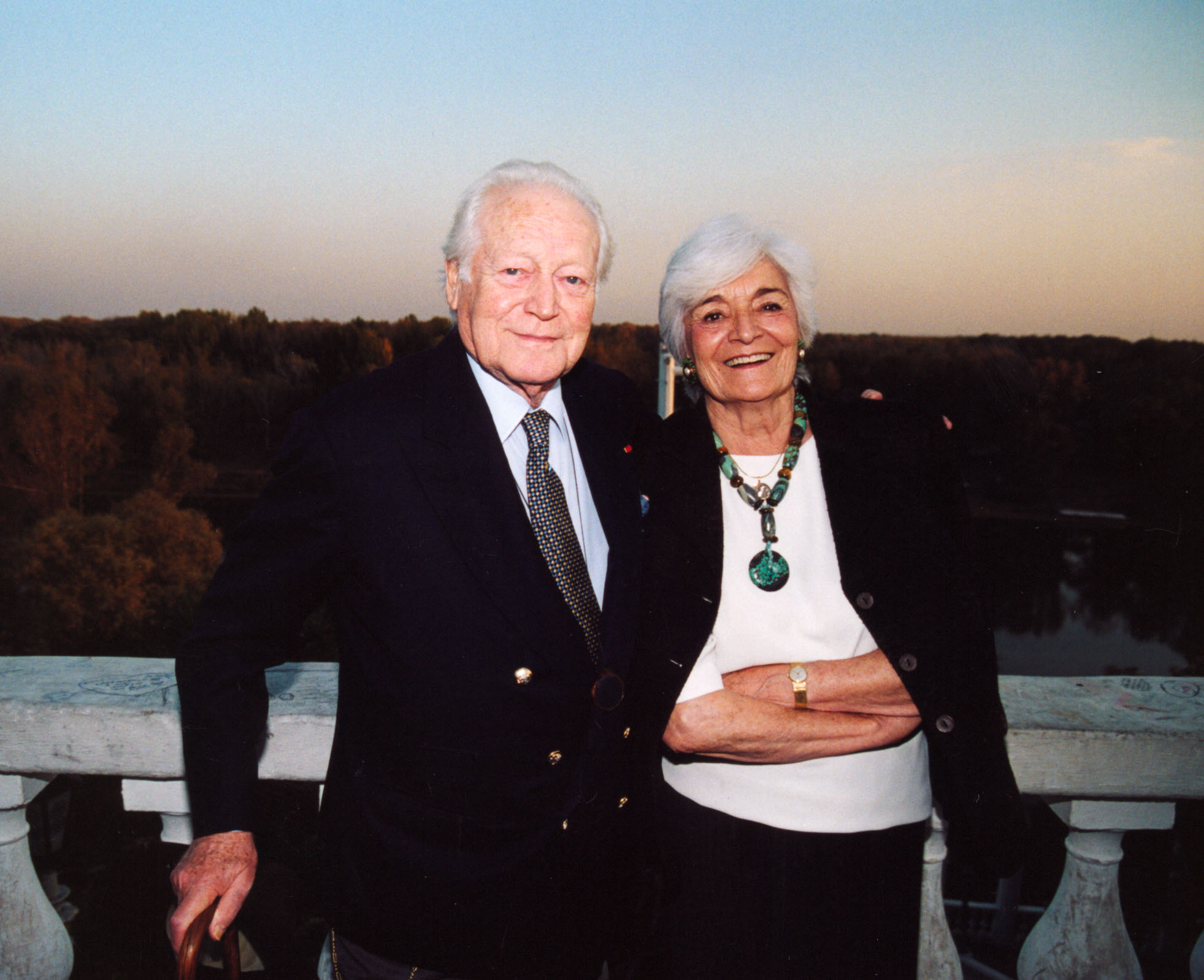
Maurice Druon in Orenburg, 2003.
