= Succession to the French throne =

Mechanism of succession in France between 486 and 1870

Succession to the French throne covers the mechanism by which the French crown passed from the establishment of the Frankish Kingdom in 486 to the fall of the Second French Empire in 1870.

== Merovingian dynasty ==
Austrasia, homeland of the Franks (darkest green), and subsequent conquests (other shades of green).

The Merovingians were a Salian Frankish dynasty that came to rule the Franks in a region (known as Francia in Latin) largely corresponding to ancient Gaul from the middle of the 5th century.

Clovis I was the first Germanic ruler to convert to Christianity. The Franks began to adopt Christianity following the baptism of Clovis, an event that inaugurated the alliance between the Frankish kingdom and the Catholic Church. Even so, the Merovingian kings were largely beyond the control of the Pope. Because they were able to worship with their Catholic neighbors, the newly-Christianized Franks found much easier acceptance from the local Gallo-Roman population than did the Arian Visigoths, Vandals or Burgundians. The Merovingians thus built what eventually proved the most stable of the successor-kingdoms in the west.

Following Frankish custom, the kingdom was partitioned among Clovis' four sons, and over the next century this tradition of partition continued. Even when several Merovingian kings simultaneously ruled their own realms, the kingdom — not unlike the late Roman Empire — was conceived of as a single entity. Externally, the kingdom, even when divided under different kings, maintained unity and conquered Burgundy in 534. After the fall of the Ostrogoths, the Franks also conquered Provence. Internally, the kingdom was divided among Clovis' sons and later among his grandsons which frequently saw war between the different kings, who allied among themselves and against one another. The death of one king created conflict between the surviving brothers and the deceased's sons, with differing outcomes. Due to frequent warfare, the kingdom was occasionally united under one king. Although this prevented the kingdom from being fragmented into numerous parts, this practice weakened royal power, for they had to make concessions to the nobility to procure their support in war.

In each Frankish kingdom the Mayor of the Palace served as the chief officer of state. From about the turn of the eighth century, the Austrasian Mayors tended to wield the real power in the kingdom, laying the foundation for a new dynasty.

== Carolingian dynasty ==
The Carolingians consolidated their power in the late seventh century, eventually making the offices of mayor of the palace and dux et princeps Francorum hereditary and becoming the de facto rulers of the Franks as the real powers behind the throne.

To legalize the power already being exercised by the mayors of the palace, Pepin requested and received from the pope a decision that whoever exercised the actual power in the kingdom should be the legal ruler. After this decision the throne was declared vacant. Childeric III was deposed and confined to a monastery.

According to ancient custom, Pepin was then elected King of the Franks by an assembly of Frankish nobles, with a large portion of his army on hand (in case the nobility inclined not to honor the Papal bull). Although such elections happened infrequently, a general rule in Germanic law stated that the king relied on the support of his leading men. These men reserved the right to choose a new leader if they felt that the old one could not lead them in profitable battle. While in later France the kingdom became hereditary, the kings of the later Holy Roman Empire proved unable to abolish the elective tradition and continued as elected rulers until the Empire's formal end in 1806. In 754 the pope reaffirmed the election of Pepin by crossing the Alps and personally anointing the new king in the Old Testament manner, as the Chosen of the Lord.

Behind the pope's action lay his need for a powerful protector. In 751 the Lombards had conquered the Exarchate of Ravenna, the center of Byzantine government in Italy, were demanding tribute from the pope, and threatened to besiege Rome. Following Pepin's coronation, the pope secured the new ruler's promise of armed intervention in Italy and his pledge to give the papacy the Exarchate of Ravenna, once it was conquered. In 756 a Frankish army forced the Lombard king to relinquish his conquests, and Pepin officially gave Ravenna to the pope. Known as the "Donation of Pepin," the gift made the pope a temporal ruler over the Papal States, a strip of territory that extended diagonally across northern Italy.

The greatest Carolingian monarch was Charlemagne, who was crowned Emperor by Pope Leo III at Rome in 800. His empire, ostensibly a continuation of the Roman Empire, is referred to historiographically as the Carolingian Empire.

The Carolingians followed the Frankish custom of dividing inheritances among the surviving sons, though the concept of the indivisibility of the Empire was also accepted. The Carolingians had the practice of making their sons (sub-)kings in the various regions (regna) of the Empire, which they would inherit on the death of their father. Though the Carolingian Empire may have several kings, the imperial dignity was accorded only to the oldest son.

Charlemagne had three legitimate sons who survived infancy: Charles the Younger, King of Neustria, Pepin, King of Italy, and Louis, King of Aquitaine. In the Divisio Regnorum of 806, Charlemagne had slated Charles the Younger as his successor as emperor and chief king, ruling over the Frankish heartland of Neustria and Austrasia, while giving Pepin the throne of Lombardy, which Charlemagne possessed by conquest. To Louis's kingdom of Aquitaine, he added Septimania, Provence, and part of Burgundy. But Charlemagne's other legitimate sons died – Pepin in 810 and Charles in 811 – and Louis alone remained to be crowned co-emperor with Charlemagne in 813. Pepin, King of Italy, left behind a son, Bernard. On the death of Charlemagne in 814, Louis inherited the entire Frankish kingdom and all its possessions (the concept of successional representation was not yet well-established). But Bernard was allowed to retain control of Italy, the sub-kingdom of his father.

Following the death of Louis the Pious, the surviving adult Carolingians fought a three-year civil war ending only in the Treaty of Verdun, which divided the empire into three regna while imperial status and a nominal lordship was accorded to Lothair I.

The Carolingians differed markedly from the Merovingians in that they disallowed inheritance to illegitimate offspring, possibly in an effort to prevent infighting among heirs and assure a limit to the division of the realm. In the late ninth century, however, the lack of suitable adults among the Carolingians necessitated the rise of Arnulf of Carinthia, a bastard child of a legitimate Carolingian king.

The Carolingians were displaced in most of the regna of the Empire in 888. They ruled on in East Francia until 911 and they held the throne of West Francia intermittently until 987. Though they asserted their prerogative to rule, their hereditary, God-given right, and their usual alliance with the Church, they were unable to stem the principle of electoral monarchy and their propagandism failed them in the long run. Carolingian cadet branches continued to rule in Vermandois and Lower Lorraine after the last king died in 987, but they never sought thrones of principalities and made peace with the new ruling families.

== Capetian dynasty ==
=== The election of Hugh Capet ===
From 977 to 986, Hugh Capet, son of Hugh the Great, Duke of the Franks, allied himself with the German emperors Otto II and Otto III and with Archbishop Adalberon of Reims to dominate the Carolingian king, Lothair. By 986, he was king in all but name. After Lothair's son Louis V died in May 987, Adalberon and Gerbert of Aurillac convened an assembly of nobles to elect Hugh Capet as their king.

Immediately after his coronation, Hugh began to push for the coronation of his son Robert. Hugh's own claimed reason was that he was planning an expedition against the Moorish armies harassing Borrel II of Barcelona, an invasion which never occurred, and that the stability of the country necessitated two kings should he die while on expedition. Ralph Glaber, however, attributes Hugh's request to his old age and inability to control the nobility. Modern scholarship has largely imputed to Hugh the motive of establishing a dynasty against the claims of electoral power on the part of the aristocracy, but this is not the typical view of his contemporaries and even some modern scholars have been less skeptical of Hugh's "plan" to campaign in Spain. Robert was eventually crowned on 25 December 987. A measure of Hugh's success is that when he died in 996, Robert continued to reign without anyone disputing his rights, but during his long reign actual royal power dissipated into the hands of the great territorial magnates.

Thus, the early Capetians made their position de facto hereditary by associating their eldest sons with the kingship while they still lived. By the death of Philip I, this hereditary feature had become established in custom. Even though Philip refused to have his son crowned during his lifetime, Louis succeeded with little trouble. Yet the association of the eldest son to the kingship continued for two more generations, with Philip II Augustus being the last king so crowned.

=== The succession in 1031 ===
Henry I became sole ruler on his father's death in 1031. The succession, however, was hotly contested by his younger brother Robert. Constance of Arles, Henry's mother, preferred to place her younger son, Robert, on the throne. She allied herself with one of the more powerful counts of the time, Odo II, Count of Blois.

This alliance was particularly worrisome for Henry I. Odo II of Blois was a very powerful lord and had warred against Henry's father throughout his reign; he had enlarged his possessions to the point of encircling the royal demesne. With his alliance, the queen mother and her son Robert managed to expel King Henry from his own demesne lands, forcing him to seek refuge at the court of the duke of Normandy, Robert.

King Henry formed an alliance with the powerful duke of Normandy, Robert, by granting him the French Vexin, or the lands between the rivers Epte and Oise. Although this has been debated by modern scholarship, the fact remains that Robert fought alongside the king. Henry also managed to gain the alliance of another powerful count, Baldwin IV of Flanders.

Finally, Henry added Emperor Henry II to his camp. The emperor had personal issues with Odo II. He wished nothing more than to rid himself of a powerful foe and troublesome neighbour. Odo had invaded Henry's lands in Burgundy and took many castles and places. Henry and his allies recovered the royal lands that had been lost to the usurpers. The conflict didn't end there; there was still a chance for Robert to win the throne. Henry, to guarantee his brother's submission, granted him the vast duchy of Burgundy, which had been added to the royal demesne by Robert II.

Odo found himself in Imperial Burgundy against Henry II. At the battle of Bar-le-Duc, Odo was killed in battle in the year 1037. His lands and properties were divided amongst his sons, ending a threat against the Capetian monarchy.

Henry I had managed to maintain his royal title and dignity, but the price was great. The greatest problem to have arisen from the crisis was the growth in independence of the lords and castellans in the lands of the royal demesne. This had the effect of weakening royal authority even further. Secondly, Henry I lost a great deal of territory and land in suppressing the revolt. The French Vexin was granted away to the duke of Normandy, the duchy of Burgundy, a substantial part of the royal demesne, was given away to Robert, the king's younger brother.

==== The appanage system ====
An appanage is a fief conceded to a younger son or a younger brother of the king. In France, the origin of the appanage can be found either in the old Frankish custom of dividing the inheritance between the sons (a custom which feudalism replaced with the partage noble in which the eldest son received most of the estates); or in the fact that, at its origins, the Capetian monarchy was relatively weak, and the principle of succession by the eldest son was not secure until the late 12th century.

The first such appanage in the history of the Capetian monarchy was the duchy of Burgundy, which Henry I ceded to his younger brother Robert. Later, Louis VII gave Dreux to his son Robert, in 1137, Philip Augustus gave Domfront and Mortain to his younger son Philip Hurepel (who had also become count of Boulogne by marriage). The last two cases were not under the same kind of duress, but probably reflect the same desire to ward off quarrels.

The original appanages, just like other feudal fiefs, could pass through the female line. As the monarchy became more powerful, they began to restrict the transmission of appanages to the male line, although this did not become standard for some time. The greatest example is the Duchy of Burgundy, which may have been illegally confiscated by Louis XI after the death of the last male duke. After Burgundy, the restriction to male heirs became standard (it is mentioned in an ordinance of Charles V in 1374), but was not formalized until the Edict of Moulins in 1566.

The Capetians also conceded fiefs to daughters or sisters in the form of dowry, although this practice became less and less common over time.

=== The end of the "Capetian miracle" ===
The Salic law (Lex Salica) is a code of law written around the time of Clovis I for the Salian Franks, in Latin mixed with Germanic words. It deals mainly with monetary compensations (wehrgeld) and also with civil law with respect to men and land. Clause 6 in title 59, which deals with inheritance rules for allodial lands (i.e. family lands not held in benefice) specifies that in "concerning Salic lands (terra Salica) no portion or inheritance is for a woman but all the land belongs to members of the male sex who are brothers." A capitulary of Chilperic, ca. 575, expands this by admitting inheritance by a daughter in the absence of sons: "if a man had neighbors but after his death sons and daughters remained, as long as there were sons they should have the land just as the Salic law provides. And if the sons are already dead then a daughter may receive the land just as the sons would have done had they lived." The monarchy is nowhere mentioned. The Salic Law was reformulated under Charlemagne and still applied in the 9th century, but it slowly disappeared as it became incorporated into local common laws. By the 14th century it was completely forgotten.

From 987 to 1316, every king of France was fortunate enough to have a son to succeed him. This state of affairs lasted over three hundred years, spanning 13 generations. The Capetians did not even have to deal with the question of successional representation; Hugh Magnus, eldest son of Robert II, and Philip, eldest son of Louis VI, did not leave behind children of their own when they predeceased their respective fathers. Thus, for such a long time, the succession to the throne was undisputed, so that there was no reason for the peers of the realm to elect a new king. Since 987, the Capetians had always passed the crown to their eldest surviving son, and this birthright became itself a source of unquestionable legitimacy. Louis VIII was the last king acclaimed before the sacred unction (the last remnant of the original election). From St. Louis, in 1226, the king was acclaimed after the anointing. The voice of the barons was no longer necessary in determining the king.

Philip the Fair was not concerned about the lack of male heirs. He had three sons, well married, and a daughter, Isabella of France, Queen of England by her marriage to Edward II of England. The eldest son, Louis the Quarrelsome, was King of Navarre and Count of Champagne since the death of his mother. He would, at the death of his father, become King of France and Navarre. His wife, Margaret of Burgundy had given him a daughter, but she was young and he could expect her to give him a son later. As for his two other sons, Philip, Count of Poitiers and Charles, Count of La Marche, they had married the two daughters of Otto IV, Count of Burgundy and Mahaut, Countess of Artois, Joan and Blanche. The king could believe that his succession was assured.

Everything collapsed in the spring of 1314, when the affairs of the daughters-in-law of the king were discovered (also known as the Tour de Nesle Affair). Somewhat neglected by their husbands, the princesses entertained themselves without them. The lover of Margaret of Burgundy was a young knight named Gauthier d'Aunay. Gautier's brother, Philippe d'Aunay, was meanwhile Blanche's lover. Without participating in the adventures of her sister and her sister-in-law, Joan knew everything and kept silent. Royal reaction was brutal. The Aunay brothers were tried and executed summarily; Margaret of Burgundy died of cold in the tower of Chateau Gaillard; Blanche of Burgundy was imprisoned for ten years before ending her days in Maubuisson Abbey, near Pontoise.

The dynastic succession was jeopardized. Margaret's death would allow Louis to remarry. But in the summer of 1314, the future king of France had no wife and no son. He only had a daughter, Joan, who could not be denied the inheritance of Navarre (which allowed female inheritance). This girl was suspected of illegitimacy, because of her mother's adultery with Gauthier d'Aunay, which could be dangerous for the crown of France, given the risk of particularly serious political crises because of suspicions of illegitimacy. Any rebellious vassal, to legitimize his rebellion, could accuse the future queen of bastardy.

Louis X died on June 5, 1316, having just had time to marry again, after a reign of eighteen months, leaving his new wife Clementia of Hungary pregnant. Philip of Poitiers was at Lyon at the day of the death of his brother. The prince took the regency of both France and Navarre. Joan's claim was supported by her maternal grandmother, Agnes of France, and her uncle, Odo IV, Duke of Burgundy. The arguments they invoked in favor of Joan were in full conformity with feudal law which had always authorized a daughter to succeed to the fief in the absence of sons. Indeed, female succession was a reality in France. Aquitaine had been ruled by a duchess, Eleanor, and countesses had ruled Toulouse and Champagne, as well as in Flanders and Artois. Mahaut, Countess of Artois, belonged to the Court of Peers since 1302. Outside the realm, women had played a role in the devolution of the English crown as well as the crown of the Latin Kingdom of Jerusalem. And Joan I of Navarre had brought her kingdom of Navarre to her husband Philip the Fair. The idea that a woman would become queen of France was in itself nothing shocking to the barons. Indeed, at the death of Louis VIII, the kingdom was governed by a woman — Blanche of Castile — regent in the name of her young son Louis IX.

The regent made a treaty with the Duke of Burgundy. It was agreed that if Queen Clementia of Hungary gave birth to a son, Philip would maintain the regency until his nephew's majority. In the event that the queen gave birth to a daughter, Philip undertook to renounce Navarre and Champagne in favor of the princesses, if they renounced the crown of France at the age of consent. If not, their claim was to remain, and "right was to be done to them therein"; but Philip would no longer renounce Navarre and Champagne.

On November 15, 1316, Queen Clementia gave birth to a son, John the Posthumous. Unfortunately, the child lived only five days, and the kingdom remained without a direct heir. By his treaty with the Duke of Burgundy, Philip would only rule the two kingdoms as regent or governor, until Joan reached the age of consent. But Philip had himself crowned at Rheims, on January 9, 1317. Opposed by the Duke of Burgundy, and his own brother, Charles, Count of La Marche, it was thought prudent to shut the gates of the town during the ceremony. Back at Paris, an assembly of prelates, barons and burgesses acknowledged Philip as their sovereign, and asserted that "women do not succeed to the French throne."

The Duke of Burgundy championed his niece's rights. Philip won him over by giving him his daughter, Joan of France, with the promise of the counties of Artois and Burgundy. The princess Joan, daughter of Louis X, was given an annuity of 15,000 pounds. In return, Joan of Navarre must, at her twelfth year, ratify the treaty which disinherited her, not only of her claim to France, but also of her unquestionable right to Navarre and Champagne.

In 1322, Philip V the Tall died after a reign of six years. He left only daughters. Thus, his younger brother, Charles of La Marche, would become king under the name of Charles IV the Fair. Despite two successive marriages with Marie of Luxembourg and Joan of Évreux, Charles the Fair, as his brother Philip the Tall, left only daughters when he died in 1328. Thus, in less than fourteen years, the three sons of Philip the Fair, Louis X the Quarrelsome, Philip V the Tall and Charles IV the Fair, had died.

However, like his brother Louis X, Charles IV the Fair left his wife pregnant. Before dying, the youngest son of Philip the Fair designated as regent his cousin, Philip of Valois. He was the eldest son of Charles of Valois, brother of Philip the Fair. A few months later, Queen Joan of Évreux gave birth to a daughter, Blanche. Philip of Valois, a grown man and prominent lord, had no trouble being proclaimed king by another assembly of lords and prelates in Vincennes and crowned on May 29, 1328.

=== The succession in 1328 ===
King Charles IV was no more. He had no male descendants. He was the youngest son of Philip the Fair. The situation in 1328 was unlike that of 1316. In 1316, a king's son was competing with a brother and a younger child. In 1328, Philip of Valois was not the closest in the line, or the more direct, because the last Capetians girls left now had husbands. But the Count of Valois was the closest male relative in the male line, and he was 35 years old. He was the eldest male of the family.

The French royal family in 1328

Philip III of France "the Bold" r. 1270–1285
Philip IV of France and Navarre "the Fair" r. 1285–1314	Charles of France; Count of Valois d. 1325	Louis of France; Count of Évreux d. 1319
Louis X of France "the Stubborn" r. 1314–1316	Philip V of France "the Tall" r. 1316–1322	Charles IV of France "the Fair" r. 1322–1328	Isabella of France	Edward II of England	Philip of Valois count of Valois b. 1293
John I of France "the Posthumous" r. 1316	Joan of France, Queen of Navarre b. 1312	Joan III, Countess of Burgundy b. 1308	Edward III of England b. 1312	Philip of Évreux; King of Navarre as Philip III b. 1306
Charles II of Évreux; King of Navarre b.1332	Philip of Burgundy b. 1323

==== The contenders for the throne ====
- Philip, Count of Valois, nephew of Philip IV, cousin of the last three kings, regent of the kingdom by the wish of Charles the Fair. He was in a strong position: he was popular with the nobility and supported by influential figures such as Robert of Artois. In the male line, he was closest to the scepter.
- Philip, Count of Évreux, also a nephew of Philip the Fair, (he was the son of Louis of Évreux, younger half-brother of Philip IV and Charles of Valois). Philip of Évreux was also first cousin of the last three kings. Moreover, he had improved his position by marrying the daughter of Louis X, Joan of France.

While the peers of France deliberated which of these two powerful lords would ascend the throne, a letter arrived from across the Channel. In this letter, Isabella claimed the crown of France for her young son Edward III, King of England, and he would be regarded as the third contender:

- Edward III, King of England and Duke of Guyenne: grandson of Philip IV by his mother, Isabella, sister to Louis X, Philip V and Charles IV. He was the nephew of the last three kings of France. In 1328, he was only 16 years and was still under the tutelage of his mother.

The peers and the lawyers were studying this question: could Isabella of France transmit a right she did not have? Could her son Edward claim the crown of the Capetians?

Isabella of France had a horrible reputation. Nicknamed the "She-Wolf of France", she had joined the English nobles against her husband, King Edward II, who was defeated and captured. After putting her husband to death, she had displayed herself in public with her lover, the regicide Roger Mortimer. All of this was well known in France. Also, her son Edward III belonged to the House of Plantagenet, a dynasty that had long been in conflict with the French crown.

But Isabella's reasoning was flawed by a detail as it were negligible: if, as a woman, Isabella could transfer that right to the crown although she could not have it for herself, then by primogeniture the true heir would have been Philip of Burgundy, a grandson of Philip V of France. Isabella of France may have simply forgotten that her brothers had left daughters of their own.

However, no one thought of nominating one of the daughters of the three kings; to do so would recognize the right of women to the throne, and would be de facto considering the reigns of Philip V the Tall and Charles IV the Fair as nothing but a theft at the expense of Joan of France, daughter of Louis X the Stubborn. Nor did they nominate the young Philip of Burgundy, the senior living male heir of Philip IV.

The peers did not want to risk giving the throne to a bastard. And, instead of proposing a daughter of Philip V or Charles IV, they decided that women should be excluded from succession to avoid endless squabbles of law.

The famous Salic law was rediscovered in 1358, and used in a propaganda fight to defend the rights of Valois against the claims of the English king. Thus, whatever the legal twist, the rights of Edward III were very questionable.

==== The king found ====
The day after the funeral of Charles IV of France, the great nobles convened. Valois has already taken the title of regent, and used it already, while his cousin was dying. The assembly could only bow to the facts. Having postponed for a moment the question of the legitimacy of excluding women from succession, the will to rule out the English king was stronger. Edward III was thus ousted from the competition, but there remained two claimants to the throne, Philip of Valois and Philip of Évreux.

An agreement was reached to satisfy everyone. Philip of Évreux and his wife Joan received the kingdom of Navarre and other territorial compensation in exchange for which they would recognize Philip of Valois as King of France.

The kingdom of Navarre belonged to the King of France since the marriage of Philip IV and Joan I of Navarre, Countess of Champagne and Brie. Louis X had inherited Navarre from his mother and in 1328 his daughter Joan was finally recognized as Queen of Navarre, despite the suspicions of illegitimacy (the late return was not in the least prevented by Philip the Tall and Charles the Fair, who officially called themselves Kings of France and Navarre). In addition, Philip of Valois, not being himself a descendant and heir of the kings of Navarre as were his predecessors, could restore the kingdom of Navarre without regret to Joan, the rightful heir, in exchange for her giving up the crown of France. The kingdom of Navarre would not return to the kings of France until much later, when Henry of Navarre, the future Henry IV, acceded to the throne of France, thus establishing the Bourbon dynasty. Thereafter, the French kings would again bear the title "King of France and Navarre."

Soon after, Philip of Valois was proclaimed King of France under the name of Philip VI of France by the peers of the realm. The Valois took power following the direct Capetians.

=== The Hundred Years War ===
The last royal election dated back to Louis VIII the Lion in 1223. The royal power was weakened and so was the legitimacy of the Count of Valois, for it was not as unassailable as that of his predecessors on the throne. They were expecting generous gifts and great concessions from the new king. Edward III came to pay tribute to the French king, hoping also for some territorial compensation. Philip VI did not understand the danger that threatened him and did nothing to protect himself.

The succession to Charles IV the Fair, decided in favor of Philip VI, was used as a pretext by Edward III to transform what would have been a feudal struggle between himself as Duke of Guyenne against the King of France, to a dynastic struggle between the House of Plantagenet and the House of Valois for control of the French throne.

The conflict, known as the Hundred Years War, dragged on for decades. England won several famous military victories, but was unable to fully overcome French resistance. Yet in the aftermath of the Battle of Agincourt, Henry V of England, great-grandson of Edward III, became the heir to the French throne in accordance to the Treaty of Troyes. He would marry Catherine, daughter of King Charles VI of France, while Charles' son, the Dauphin Charles was declared illegitimate and disinherited.

Yet Henry V would predecease Charles VI, and it was his infant son who would become "King of France". The Dauphin still had his supporters, and became Charles VII. Eventually, the tide would turn in favor of the French, and the English were driven out. The Treaty of Troyes, which had been ratified by the Estates-General of France, was never repudiated, but the military victory of Charles VII rendered its provisions moot. The Kings of England would thereby continue to call themselves "Kings of England and France", dropping the nominal claim to France only in 1800.

Thus emerged the principle of the unavailability of the crown — no person or body could divert the succession from the lawful heir. The throne would pass by the sheer force of custom, not by the testament of the king, or by any edict, decree, or treaty, or by the generosity of any person. By this principle, the French do not consider Henry VI of England as a legitimate king of France.

=== The succession in 1589 ===
The House of Valois had secured the principle of agnatic succession following their victory in the Hundred Years War. When the senior line of the Valois became extinct, they were followed by the Valois-Orléans line descended from Louis I, Duke of Orléans, younger brother of Charles VI, and then, by the Valois-Angoulême line descended from a younger son of Louis I.

Henry II of France was succeeded by his sons, none of whom would succeed in producing a male heir. The sons of Henry II would be the last heirs male of Philip III of France. Right after them ranked the Bourbons, descended from a younger brother of Philip III.

Thus, with the death of François, Duke of Anjou, younger brother of King Henry III of France, the heir presumptive became the Head of the House of Bourbon, Henry III, King of Navarre. Since Henry was a Protestant, most of Catholic France found him unacceptable. By the Treaty of Nemours, the Catholic League attempted to disinherit the King of Navarre by recognizing Charles, Cardinal de Bourbon, Navarre's uncle, as heir. Navarre had been excommunicated by Pope Sixtus V.

On his deathbed, Henry III called for Henry of Navarre, and begged him, in the name of statecraft, to become a Catholic, citing the brutal warfare that would ensue if he refused. In keeping with Salic law, he named Navarre as his heir.

On Henry III's death in 1589, the League proclaimed the Cardinal de Bourbon king, while he was still a prisoner of Henry III in the castle of Chinon. He was recognized as Charles X by the Parliament of Paris on 21 November 1589. With Henry III's death, custody of the Cardinal fell to Navarre (now Henry IV of France), the Cardinal's nephew. When the old Cardinal died in 1590, the League could not agree on a new candidate. The Catholic League had great hopes for Charles, Duke of Guise, whom they considered to elect as king. However, the Duke of Guise declared his support for Henry IV of France in 1594, for which Henry paid him four million livres and made him Governor of Provence. Some supported Infanta Isabella Clara Eugenia of Spain, the daughter of Philip II of Spain and Elisabeth of France, eldest daughter of Henry II of France. The prominence of her candidacy hurt the League, which became suspect as agents of the Spanish.

For a time, Henry IV attempted to take his kingdom by conquest. For this, he had to capture Paris, which was defended by the Catholic League and the Spanish. Despite the campaigns between 1590 and 1592, Henry IV was "no closer to capturing Paris". Realizing that Henry III had been right and that there was no prospect of a Protestant king succeeding in resolutely Catholic Paris, Henry agreed to convert, reputedly stating "Paris vaut bien une messe" ("Paris is well worth a Mass"). He was formally received into the Catholic Church in 1593, and was crowned at Chartres in 1594 as League members maintained control of the Cathedral of Rheims, and, skeptical of Henry's sincerity, continued to oppose him. He was finally received into Paris in March 1594, and 120 League members in the city who refused to submit were banished from the capital. Paris' capitulation encouraged the same of many other towns, while others returned to support the crown after Pope Clement VIII absolved Henry, revoking his excommunication in return for the publishing of the Tridentine Decrees, the restoration of Catholicism in Béarn, and appointing only Catholics to high office.

With the success of Henry IV, the principles of the French succession were kept inviolable. The kingship of Charles, Cardinal de Bourbon, as Charles X, was delegitimized, having been contrary to these principles. A new requirement to the French succession was recognized: the King of France must be Catholic. Yet since religion could be changed, it could not be the basis for permanent exclusion from the throne.

=== The Bourbons in Spain ===
Louis XIV, grandson of Henry IV, was the longest-reigning king in European history. Louis XIV had only one legitimate son to survive to adulthood, the Dauphin Louis. The Dauphin, in turn, had three sons: Louis, Duke of Burgundy, Philip, Duke of Anjou, and Charles, Duke of Berry.

In 1700, Charles II of Spain died. His heir, in accordance to cognatic primogeniture followed in Spain, would have been the Dauphin Louis. However, since the Dauphin was the heir to the French throne, and the Duke of Burgundy was in turn the Dauphin's heir, Charles II settled his succession on the Duke of Anjou in order to prevent the union of France and Spain.

Most European rulers accepted Philip as King of Spain, though some only reluctantly. Louis XIV confirmed that Philip V retained his French rights despite his new Spanish position. Admittedly, he may only have been hypothesizing a theoretical eventuality and not attempting a Franco-Spanish union. However, Louis also sent troops to the Spanish Netherlands, evicting Dutch garrisons and securing Dutch recognition of Philip V. In 1701, he transferred the asiento to France, alienating English traders. He also acknowledged James Stuart, James II's son, as king on the latter's death. These actions enraged Britain and the United Provinces. Consequently, with the Emperor and the petty German states, they formed another Grand Alliance, declaring war on France in 1702. French diplomacy, however, secured Bavaria, Portugal and Savoy as Franco-Spanish allies.

Thus, the War of the Spanish Succession began. The war, over a decade long, was concluded by the treaties of Utrecht (1713) and Rastatt (1714). The allies were bent on removing Philip V from the succession to the French throne; he only agreed to this after the semi-Salic law was successfully enacted in Spain.

However, the fact remained that the Treaty of Utrecht had disregarded the French principles of succession. Indeed, taking advantage of the power vacuum caused by Louis XIV's death in 1715, Philip announced he would claim the French crown if the infant Louis XV died.

The validity of the renunciations was not debated in public until the French Revolution, when the National Assembly first addressed this issue in a three-day session beginning on 15 September 1789. After many debates, the Assembly voted on a final text of a statement defining the succession to the Crown. This read: "The crown is hereditary from male to male, by order of primogeniture, with the absolute exclusion of women and their descendants, without prejudging the effect of renunciations". The Spanish Ambassador, the Count of Fernan Nuñez wrote to the Spanish Prime Minister, the Count of Floridablanca, that same date: "All the clergy and the major part of the nobility and also of the Third Estate has pronounced for the resolution favorable to the House of Spain… by 698 votes to 265 the majority had concluded the question in a sense again most advantageous for us...."

In 1791 the French National Assembly drew up a new, written Constitution to which the King gave his assent, and which governed France for the last year of the 18th century monarchy. For the first time it was necessary to define formally, as a matter of statutory constitutional law, the system of succession, and the titles, privileges and prerogatives of the Crown. In debating the succession to the Crown the contemporary understanding of the law of succession was publicly clarified. It rebutted the assertion by some that the claim by the Spanish line is a late construct, made to satisfy the ambitions of princes deprived of other claims. Indeed, it is evident that the issue of the rights of the Spanish line to the French crown remained an important constitutional issue.

When the issue of the rights of the Spanish line arose, the Assembly voted to include a phrase in the article on the succession that implicitly protected their rights. That this was the purpose of the clause seems certain: hence the phrase in Title III, Chapter II, article I:

"The Kingship is indivisible, and delegated hereditarily to the reigning dynasty from male to male, by order of primogeniture, with the permanent exclusion of women and their descendants. (Nothing is prejudged on the effect of renunciations in the dynasty actually reigning)."

=== The end of a dynasty ===
Louis XV had ten legitimate children, but there were only two sons, only one of whom survived to adulthood, Louis, Dauphin of France. This did not help dispel the concerns about the future of the dynasty; should his male line fail, the succession would be disputed by a possible war of succession between the descendants of Philip V and the House of Orléans descended from the younger brother of Louis XIV.

The Dauphin Louis predeceased his father but left behind three sons, Louis Auguste, Duke of Berry, Louis Stanislas, Count of Provence and Charles Philippe, Count of Artois. The Duke of Berry succeeded his grandfather as King Louis XVI and had his coronation ceremony in 1775.

Louis XVI would be the only French king to be executed, during the French Revolution. For the first time, the Capetian monarchy had been overthrown. The monarchy would be restored under his younger brother, the Count of Provence, who took the name Louis XVIII in consideration of the dynastic seniority of his nephew, "Louis XVII," from 1793 to 1795 (the child never actually reigned). Louis XVIII died childless and was succeeded by his younger brother, the Count of Artois, as Charles X in 1824. His elaborate coronation ceremony the following year drew heavily on the traditions of the pre-1789 monarch to emphasise continuity.

Compelled by what he felt to be a growing, manipulative radicalism in the elected government, Charles felt that his primary duty was the guarantee of order and happiness in France and its people; not in political bipartisanship and the self-interpreted rights of implacable political enemies. He issued the Four Ordinances of Saint-Cloud, which was intended to quell the people of France. However, the ordinances had the opposite effect of angering the French citizens. In Paris, a committee of the liberal opposition had drawn up and signed a petition in which, they asked for the ordinances to be withdrawn; more surprising was their criticism "not of the King, but his ministers" – thereby disproving Charles X's conviction that his liberal opponents were enemies of his dynasty. Charles X considered the ordinances vital to the safety and dignity of the French throne, and refused to withdraw them. This resulted in the July Revolution.

Charles X abdicated in favor of his 10-year-old grandson, Henri, Duke of Bordeaux, (forcing his son Louis Antoine to renounce his rights along the way) and naming Louis Philippe III, Duke of Orléans Lieutenant General of the Kingdom, charging him to announce to the popularly elected Chamber of Deputies his desire to have his grandson succeed him. Louis Philippe requested that the duke of Bordeaux was sent to Paris but both Charles X and the duchess of Berry refused to leave the child behind. As a consequence, the chamber proclaimed the vacancy of the throne and designated Louis Philippe, who for eleven days had been acting as the regent for his small cousin, as the new French king, displacing the senior branch of the House of Bourbon.

=== The House of Orléans ===
The House of Orléans took the throne in defiance of the principles of the Capetian dynasty, and could be viewed as a separate institution altogether.

Upon his accession to the throne, Louis Philippe assumed the title of King of the French – a title already adopted by Louis XVI in the short-lived Constitution of 1791. Linking the monarchy to a people instead of a territory (as the previous designation King of France and of Navarre) was aimed at undercutting the legitimist claims of Charles X and his family.

By an ordinance he signed on 13 August 1830, the new king defined the manner in which his children, as well as his sister, would continue to bear the surname "d'Orléans" and the arms of Orléans, declared that his eldest son, as Prince Royal (not Dauphin), would bear the title Duke of Orléans, that the younger sons would continue to have their previous titles, and that his sister and daughters would only be styled Princesses of Orléans, not of France.

The government of Louis Philippe grew increasingly conservative over the years. After ruling for 18 years, the 1848 wave of revolutions reached France and overthrew Louis Philippe. The king abdicated in favor of his nine-year-old grandson, Philippe, Count of Paris. The National Assembly initially planned to accept young Philippe as king, but the strong current of public opinion rejected that. On 26 February, the Second Republic was proclaimed.

== House of Bonaparte ==
=== First Empire ===
Napoléon Bonaparte (1769–1821) came to power by a military coup on Nov 10, 1799. The regime he put in place was headed by three Consuls, and he was the First Consul. He became Consul for Life in 1802, and then transformed the regime into a hereditary monarchy in 1804. The rules of succession as set down in the constitution are:

- The legitimate heir to the imperial throne should pass firstly to Napoleon I's own legitimate male descendants through the male line, excluding women and their issue. Napoléon could adopt a son or grandson (aged 18 or more) of one of his brothers, if he had no children of his own. No other adoptions were allowed.
- In default of Napoléon's line (of the body or adoptive), the succession calls Joseph and his line, followed by Louis and his line. His other brothers, Lucien Bonaparte and Jérôme Bonaparte, and their descendants, were omitted from the succession, even though Lucien was older than Louis, because they had either politically opposed the emperor or made marriages of which he disapproved.
- Princes were forbidden from marrying without prior consent, on pain of losing their succession rights and excluding their issue; but if the marriage ended without children, the prince would recover his rights.
- Upon extinction of the legitimate natural and adopted males, agnatic descendants of Napoleon I, and those of two of his brothers, Joseph and Louis, the Grand Dignitaries of the Empire (non-dynastic princely and ducal houses) would submit a proposal to the Senate, to be approved by referendum, choosing a new emperor.

At the time the law of succession was decreed Napoleon I had no legitimate sons, and it seemed unlikely he would have any due to the age of his wife, Joséphine de Beauharnais. His eventual response was an unacceptable one, in the eyes of Catholic France, of engineering a dubious annulment, without papal approval, of his marriage to Josephine and undertaking a second marriage to the younger Mary Louise of Austria, with whom he had one son, Napoleon, King of Rome, also known as Napoleon II and the Duke of Reichstadt. He was not married and had no children, thus leaving no further direct descendants of Napoleon I.

The law was proclaimed on May 20, 1804. No contradiction was seen between France being a Republic and it being governed by an Emperor. Indeed, until 1809, French coins bore "République Française" on one side and "Napoléon Empereur" on the other, pursuant to a decree of June 26, 1804; the legend on the reverse was replaced by "Empire français" by decree of October 22, 1808). This was a return to the Roman use of the word Emperor (Augustus was officially only the First Citizen, rather than monarch, of the Roman Republic).

=== Second Empire ===
In 1852, Napoleon III, having restored the Bonapartes to power in France, enacted a new decree on the succession. The claim first went to his own male legitimate descendants in the male line.

If his own direct line died out, the new decree allowed the claim to pass to Jérôme Bonaparte, Napoleon I's youngest brother who had previously been excluded, and his male descendants by Princess Catharina of Württemberg in the male line. His descendants by his original marriage to the American commoner Elizabeth Patterson, of which Napoleon I had greatly disapproved, were excluded.

The only remaining Bonapartist claimants since 1879, and today, have been descendants of Jérôme Bonaparte and Catherina of Württemberg in the male line.

== France post-monarchy ==
=== Failure of the Restoration ===
In 1871, royalists became the majority in the National Assembly. There were two claimants to the French royal legacy: Henri d'Artois, Count of Chambord, and Philippe d'Orléans, Count of Paris. The former were supported by the Legitimists, supporters of the elder line of the Bourbons, and the Orléanists, liberal constitutional monarchists that had supported Louis Philippe and his line. Since the Count of Chambord was childless, and was expected to remain so, the Orléans line agreed to support the Count of Chambord.

Raised however, by his grandfather Charles X of France, as if the Revolution never happened, the Count of Chambord insisted that he would only take the crown if France would abandon the tricolour flag in favor of the white fleur de lys flag. He refused to compromise this point, which upset the restoration of the monarchy. The Orléans did not oppose him, and did not make an immediate claim to the throne while the Count of Chambord lived. The Count of Chambord lived, however, longer than expected. At the time of his death, monarchists no longer held a majority of the legislature and the impetus behind the monarchical restoration was lost.

Thus, after the death of the Count of Chambord, the Orléans line had two distinct claims to the throne of France: the right derived from Orléanist theory, as heirs of Louis Philippe; and the right derived from Legitimist theory, as heirs of Hugh Capet.

=== Legitimists and Orléanists ===
The death of the Count of Chambord split the Legitimists in two camps. Most acknowledged the House of Orléans as the new royal house. Yet a party, with a hatred for that house, recognized the Carlists of Spain, then the eldest descendants of Philip V of Spain. The Orléanist party derisively called them the Blancs d'Espagne (Spanish Whites), for having supported a Spanish prince over a French prince. In later times the Orléanist and Legitimist claims of the House of Orléans was merged into the name of Orléanist, as the pro-Spanish party assumed the name of Legitimists.

The unacceptability of the House of Orléans to the Blancs d'Espagne stems from the actions of two ancestors of that house — Louis Philippe II, Duke of Orléans, also known as Philippe Egalite, and his son Louis Philippe, later King of the French. Philippe Egalite had voted for the abolition of the monarchy, the guilt of Louis XVI, and the death sentence for that unhappy monarch. His son, Louis Philippe, restored in royal favor following the Bourbon Restoration, appointed lieutenant-general of the kingdom during the final days of the reign of Charles X, overthrew the senior line by accepting kingship for himself. According to Charles Dumoulin, a French jurist of the sixteenth century, treason is one case wherein a person of the royal blood could be deprived of his succession to the throne. However, it has been counter argued by the Orléanists that Henry IV, a common ancestor of both pretenders, succeeded to the throne despite having led Protestant forces against the French royal army in French Wars of Religion, an act the that could be viewed as treasonous.

The Legitimist stand is that the succession to the throne is based on customs and precedents thereafter unalterable. The heir to the throne, according to those customs, is the heir-male of Louis XIV, who cannot be excluded. The Orléanist stand is that among those customs and precedents is the requirement that the king must be French. The heir to the throne, according to them, is the Orléans line, since not one of Philip V's descendants was French when the succession opened in 1883.

In the Treaty of Utrecht, Philip V of Spain renounced his right of succession to the French throne on the condition that the semi-Salic law of succession should be instituted in Spain. For Legitimists the treaty is void ab initio, since the succession law cannot be altered in this way. Further, assuming arguendo that the treaty is valid, the repeal of semi-Salic law in Spain had broken the condition of the renunciation; the purpose of the treaty — the separation of the crowns of France and Spain — has been served, since the King of Spain is not the heir to France. For Orléanists the treaty is a valid alteration to the French law of succession, viewing it as a Force majeure necessary for France to make peace with the rest of Europe. They also cite that Philips actual renunciations were made in perpetuity, suggesting that his instituting of semi-Salic law within Spain was a personal condition rather than a legal one. Further, the Dukes of Orleans from 1709 to 1830 held the title, First Prince of the Blood, who were, by tradition, the first in line to the throne after the sons and male-line grandsons of the King and/or Dauphin. Had Philip V and his heirs been in line for the throne, the title would have passed to his grandson, Infante Philip, Duke of Calabria, upon the death of Louis, Duke of Orléans in 1752. Instead the title passed to the Dukes son, indicating that the Spanish Bourbons were not considered French dynasts.

The second point of contention between the Legitimists and the Orléanists is the nationality requirement. For Orléanists, foreign-born heirs forfeit their right of succession to estates in France by the law of aubain. Foreigners include, apart from the usual definition, those Frenchmen who left without intent of returning. They also cite the opinion of Charles Dumoulin, a French jurist of the sixteenth century:

Common sense requires that princes of the blood who have become foreigners be excluded from the throne just as the male descendants of princesses. The exclusion of both is in the spirit of the fundamental custom, which overlooks the royal blood in princesses only to prevent the scepter from falling in foreign hands.

For this reason, Orléanists also exclude the Orléans-Braganza (Brazilians) and Orléans-Galliera (Spanish), junior descendants of Louis Philippe, King of the French, from the succession to the French throne.

Legitimists and Orléanists cite numerous examples and counter-examples of foreigners included and excluded in the French line of succession. There is no clear precedent on whether foreigners ought to be included or excluded. But in 1573, the Duke of Anjou, the future Henry III of France, who was elected King of Poland, had been assured by letters patent that his rights to the French throne would not lapse, nor those of any children he may have, even though they were to be born outside France. Similar letters patent were issued for Philip V of Spain, but later withdrawn. In these instances, the French court had shown themselves ready to recognize that the Capetian blood right overcame the law of aubain. For Orléanists, the function of the letters patent was to preserve the French nationality of Philip V and his descendants, and with those letters patent withdrawn, they ceased to be French.

Supporters of the Orleans cite the text of the letters patent in question for their evidence that the purpose of the letters was to preserve the French status of Henry III and his heirs, stating that they would remain "original and régnicoles." A régnicole was someone who was naturally French or "every man who was born in the kingdom, country, lands and lordships of the obedience of the King of France."

== See also ==
- Fundamental laws of the Kingdom of France
- List of French monarchs
