= Blanche of France (nun) =

French princess (1313–1358)

- Born: 1313
- Died: 26 April 1358 (aged 44–45); Longchamp Abbey
- House: Capet
- Father: Philip V of France
- Mother: Joan II of Burgundy

Blanche of France (1313 – 26 April 1358), nun at Longchamp Abbey, (Note: The Abbey of Longchamp was in the Bois de Boulogne within a day's ride west of Paris.) was the fourth and youngest daughter of King Philip V of France and Countess Joan II of Burgundy.

Blanche was born in 1313, before either of her parents ascended their respective thrones, during the reign of her paternal grandfather, King Philip IV of France. She was named after her mother's ill-fated sister, Blanche of Burgundy. A year after Blanche's birth, her mother and aunts Blanche and Margaret of Burgundy were implicated in the Tour de Nesle affair. The marriage of her parents was successful enough for her father to insist on her mother's acquittal, but her aunts were imprisoned.

By the time Blanche was seven years old, her parents had become king and queen of France and Navarre and count and countess of Burgundy. Queen Joan decided that her youngest daughter should join the Order of Saint Francis, probably wishing that the girl's cloistered life could compensate for the sins of her imprisoned namesake aunt. In 1319, Blanche's parents along with her grandmother Countess Mahaut of Artois, uncle Count Charles of La Marche, and granduncle Count Charles of Valois were present at her official entrance into the nunnery at Longchamp abbey. The queen secured a special dispensation that allowed her and the king to visit their daughter frequently, but was later cautioned by the pope against visiting Blanche too often.

Despite her religious vows, Blanche is more often mentioned as daughter of a French king by primary sources than any of her titled sisters—Countesses Joan III and Margaret I of Burgundy and Dauphine Isabella of Viennois. She is presumed to have at some point owned a richly decorated Franciscan breviary, the earliest known work of Jean Pucelle. Blanche died as a Poor Clare on 26 April 1358.

== Sources ==
- Brown, Elizabeth A. R. (1978). The King's Conundrum: Endowing Queens and Loyal Servants, Ensuring Salvation, and Protecting the Patrimony in Fourteenth-Century France. Boydell & Brewer. ISBN 0851157793.
- Brown, Elizabeth A. R. (1991). The Monarchy of Capetian France and Royal Ceremonial. Variorum. ISBN 0860782794.
- Ferguson O'Meara, Carra (2001). Monarchy and consent: the coronation book of Charles V of France. Harvey Miller Publishers. ISBN 1872501109.
- Field, Sean L. (2019). Courting Sanctity: Holy Women and the Capetians. Cornell University Press.
- Harvard (1981). Harvard Historical Studies. Harvard University Press. ISBN 0860782794.
- Woodacre, Elena (2013). The Queens Regnant of Navarre: Succession, Politics, and Partnership, 1274-1512. Palgrave Macmillan.
