= Philip I =

Philip(p) I may refer to:

- Philip I of Macedon (6th century BC)
- Philip I Philadelphus (between 124 and 109 BC–83 or 75 BC)
- Philip the Arab (c. 204–249), Roman Emperor
- Philip I of France (1052–1108)
- Philip I (archbishop of Cologne) (1130–1191)
- Philip I, Count of Flanders (1143–1191)
- Philip I of Namur, (1175–1212)
- Philip I, Count of Boulogne (1200–1235)
- Philip I, Count of Savoy (1207–1285)
- Philip I, Latin Emperor (1243–1283)
- Philip IV of France, aka Philip I of Navarre (1268–1314)
- Philip I of Piedmont, known as Philip of Savoy (1278–1334) lord of Piedmont
- Philip I, Prince of Taranto (1278–1331/2)
- Philip I, Count of Auvergne (1323–1346)
- Philip of Rouvres, Duke of Burgundy (1346–1361)
- Philipp I, Count of Nassau-Weilburg (1368–1429)
- Philip I, Metropolitan of Moscow (died 1473)
- Philipp I, Count of Katzenelnbogen (1402–1479)
- Philip I, Duke of Brabant (1404–1430)
- Philipp I, Count of Hanau-Lichtenberg (1417–1480)
- Philip I de Croÿ, Count of Porcéan (1435–1511)
- Philip I, Count of Waldeck (1445–1475)
- Philipp I, Count of Hanau-Münzenberg (1449–1500)
- Philip I, Duke of Brunswick-Grubenhagen (1476–1551)
- Philip the Handsome (1478–1506), King of Castile
- Philip I, Margrave of Baden (1479-1533)
- Philip I, Count of Nassau-Wiesbaden-Idstein (1490–1558)
- Philip I, Landgrave of Hesse (1504–1567)
- Philip I, Duke of Pomerania (1515–1560)
- Philip II of Spain (1527–1598), aka Philip I of Portugal, and may also be known as jure uxoris Philip I of England
- Philip I, Count of Schaumburg-Lippe (1601–1681)

== See also ==
- Philippe I (disambiguation)
