= Philip of Burgundy =

Philip of Burgundy may refer to:

- Philip of Burgundy, Count of Auvergne (1323–1346), count-consort of Auvergne and Boulogne, son of Eudes IV, Duke of Burgundy and Princess Jeanne of France
- Philip I, Duke of Burgundy (1346–1361), also called Philip of Rouvres
- Philip II, Duke of Burgundy, the Bold, (1342–1404), son of King John II of France
- Philip the Good, duke of Burgundy, (1396–1467), son of John the Fearless
- Philip I of Castile (1478–1506), who was also known as Philip IV, Duke of Burgundy
- Philip of Burgundy (bishop) (1464–1524), illegitimate son of Philip the Good, bishop of Utrecht
