= Ysabel de Tremblay =

French merchant

Ysabel de Tremblay (died after 1316) was a French merchant.

She was married to the major draper merchant Jean de Tremblay, a Paris city official who delivered to the Count of Artois. She took over his business, which was one of the biggest in Paris, as a widow. Only two percent of the Paris drapers in 1209–1300 were women, and she was likely unique as the leader of a major company of that size. In 1313, she was taxed for 75 livres tournois, and was the only woman merchant included among the sixteen biggest tax payers in Paris.

She had a de facto monopoly as the deliverer of wool to the royal house in 1316, and as the documents for the years prior and after 1316 is missing, she likely had this monopoly much longer than that. An example of her position was that it was she who delivered the textiles used for clothing of the royal family, the members of the court and many of the guests on the coronation of King Philip V of France.
