= Joan of Burgundy =

Joan of Burgundy, or variants, may refer to:

- Joan I, Countess of Burgundy (1191-1205)
- Jeanne de Bourgogne (1200–1223), daughter of Odo III, Duke of Burgundy
- Joan II, Countess of Burgundy (c.1291–1330), Queen of France
- Joan the Lame of Burgundy (1293–1349), Queen of France
- Joan III, Countess of Burgundy (1308–1347)
