= Philip V =

Philip V may refer to:

- Philip V of Macedon (221–179 BC)
- Philip V of France (1293–1322)
- Philip II of Spain, also Philip V, Duke of Burgundy (1526–1598)
- Philip V of Spain (1683–1746)
