= Felipe I =

Felipe I is the name of two Iberian kings:

- Philip I of Castile (1478–1506), known as the Handsome or the Fair, son of Maximilian I, Holy Roman Emperor
- Philip I of Portugal (II of Spain)

== See also ==
- Philip I (disambiguation)
