= Joan III =

Joan III may refer to:

- Joan III, Countess of Burgundy (1308–1349)
- Joan III of Naples (1479–1555), a.k.a. Joanna of Castile
- Joan III of Navarre (1528–1572), a.k.a. Jeanne d'Albret
