= Jeanne III =

Jeanne III may refer to:

- Jeanne III, Countess of Burgundy (1308–1349)
- Jeanne III d'Albret (1528–1572)
