= Margaret I =

Margaret I may refer to:

- Margaret I, Countess of Flanders (died 1194)
- Margaret I of Scotland (1283–1290), usually known as the Maid of Norway
- Margaret I, Countess of Holland (1311–1356), Countess of Hainaut and Countess of Holland
- Margaret I, Countess of Burgundy (1310–1382), daughter of Philip V, Countess Palatine of Burgundy, Countess of Artois, countess-consort of Flanders, Nevers & Rethel
- Margaret I of Denmark (1353–1412), Queen of Denmark, Norway and Sweden (also later Regent of Sweden), and founder of the Kalmar Union
