= Isabella of France, Dauphine of Viennois =

French princess (1312–1348)

Isabella of France
- Capet coat of arms

Dauphine of Viennois
- Reign: 1323–1333
- Born: 1312
- Died: April 1348 (aged 35–36)
- Spouse: Guigues VIII of Viennois (m. 1323; died 1333) John III, Lord of Faucogney (m. 1335; died 1345)
- House: Capet
- Father: Philip V of France
- Mother: Joan II, Countess of Burgundy

Isabella of France and Burgundy (1312 – April 1348) was the daughter of Philip V of France and Joan II, Countess of Burgundy.

== Life ==
When Isabella was only two years old, her mother was placed under house arrest because it was thought she was having love affairs. Joan was released the following year because Isabella's father, Philip, refused to divorce her. Her aunt, Blanche of Burgundy had been imprisoned in the fortress of Château Gaillard in 1314 along with Isabella's other aunt, Margaret of Burgundy.

In 1316, her father became the King of France. The same year, her marriage with Guigues VIII of Viennois was contracted. In 1322, however, her young father died, which devastated the family. Although Isabella was still in grief, she was married in 1323, when she was just 11 years old. Her husband, Guigues, was killed while besieging the Savoyard castle of La Perrière in 1333, and was succeeded by his brother Humbert II.

== Death ==
In 1335, Isabella married John III, Lord of Faucogney. She was widowed a second a time as John died in 1345; this marriage was childless. Isabella herself died of the bubonic plague (Black Death) in April 1348.

== Sources ==
- Anselme de Sainte-Marie, Père (1726). Histoire généalogique et chronologique de la maison royale de France [Genealogical and chronological history of the royal house of France] (in French). Vol. 1 (3rd ed.). Paris: La compagnie des libraires.
- Cox, Eugene L. (1967). The Green Count of Savoy. Princeton, New Jersey: Princeton University Press.
- Morrison, Elizabeth; Hedeman, Anne Dawson, eds. (2010). Imagining the Past in France: History in Manuscript Painting, 1250–1500. J. Paul Getty Museum.
