= Joan I of Auvergne =

Queen of France (1350–1360), Countess of Auvergne and Boulogne (r. 1332–1360)

Joan I
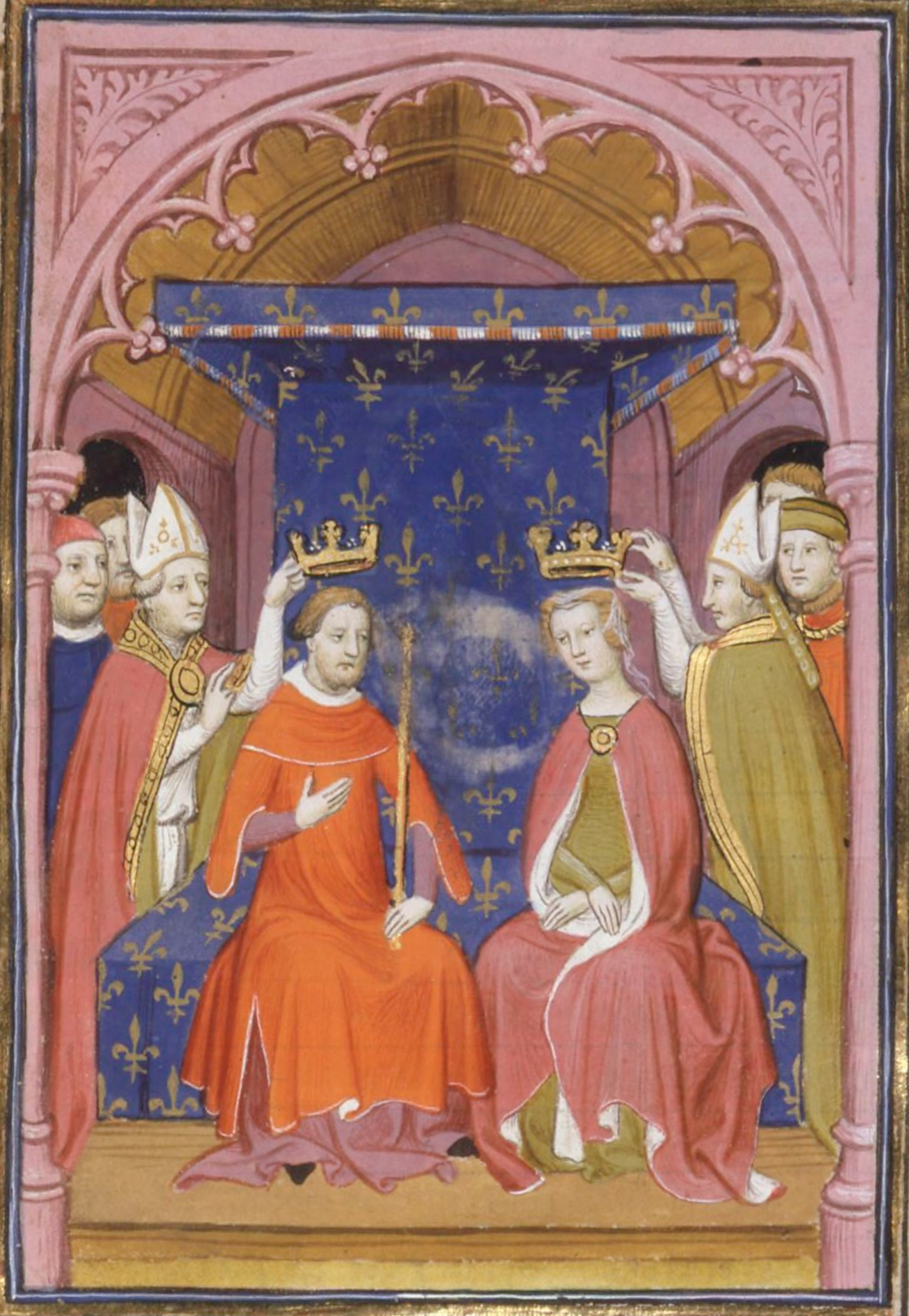
- Coronation of King John and Queen Joan

Countess of Auvergne and Boulogne
- Reign: 1332–1360
- Predecessor: William XII of Auvergne
- Successor: Philip of Rouves

Queen consort of France
- Tenure: 1350–1360
- Coronation: 26 September 1350
- Born: 8 May 1326
- Died: 29 September 1360 (aged 34)
- Burial: Saint Denis Basilica
- Spouses: Philip I, Count of Auvergne; John II, King of France
- Issue Detail.: Joan; Margaret; Philip I, Duke of Burgundy
- House: Auvergne
- Father: William XII, Count of Auvergne
- Mother: Marguerite d'Évreux

Joan I (8 May 1326 – 29 September 1360, Chateau d'Argilly) was ruling Countess of Auvergne and Boulogne from 1332 to 1360 and Queen of France by her marriage to King John II.

== Life ==
She was the daughter of William XII, Count of Auvergne and Boulogne, by his wife, Margaret, a sister of Philip III of Navarre. She inherited the counties of Auvergne and Boulogne after the death of her father.

Her first husband was Philip of Burgundy, who held the title Count of Auvergne by virtue of their marriage. They had two children that survived infancy but died as teenagers, a son Philip, who would be for much of his brief life Duke of Burgundy, and a daughter who died 11 days before her mother's death.

Following the death of her first husband, Joan married John, Duke of Normandy, 9 February 1350. This was a second marriage for them both. John's first wife, Bonne of Bohemia, had died of Black Death and had left him with eight children, so there was little pressure for Joan to give birth to a son and heir. Upon her husband's ascension to the French throne as John II, she became Queen consort of France on 22 August 1350.

Coat of arms of Joan as queen consort of France

Joan's son Philip became a ward of the King. She had three children with King John, two girls and an unnamed son, all of whom died young. Joan died in 1360. Her possessions were inherited by her son.

== Issue ==
By her first husband, Philip, Joan had the following issue:

- Joan (1344 – 11 September 1360), who was engaged to Amadeus VI of Savoy but was ultimately dismissed and lived out her life in a convent at Poissy
- Margaret (b. 1345), who died young
- Philip I of Burgundy (1346 – 21 November 1361), who was married to Margaret III of Flanders

By her second husband, John, Joan had two short-lived daughters, Blanche (November 1350) and Catherine (1352), and a short-lived son (1353).

== Sources ==
- Blockmans, Wm; Prevenier, Walter (1999). Peters, Edward (ed.). The Promised Lands: The Low Countries Under Burgundian Rule, 1369-1530. Translated by Fackelman, Elizabeth. University of Pennsylvania Press.
- Cox, Eugene L. (1967). The Green Count of Savoy. Princeton, New Jersey: Princeton University Press. LCCN 67-11030.
- Le Bel, Jean (2011). The True Chronicles of Jean Le Bel, 1290-1360. Translated by Bryant, Nigel. Boydell & Brewer.
- de Venette, Jean (1953). Newhall, Richard A. (ed.). The Chronicle of Jean de Venette. Translated by Birdsall, Jean. Columbia University Press.

French nobility
Preceded by William XII of Auvergne	Countess of Auvergne and Boulogne; 1332–1360; With: Philip of Burgundy; John II of France	Succeeded by Philip III of Boulogne
French royalty
Preceded by Blanche of Navarre	Queen consort of France; 22 August 1350 – 29 September 1360	Vacant Title next held by Joanna of Bourbon
