= House of Capet =

Royal house of France from 987 to 1328

House of Capet House of France
- Arms of the Kingdom of France
- Parent house: Robertians, Carolingians (cognatic)
- Country: Kingdom of France; Kingdom of Navarre; Kingdom of England (claimant)
- Founded: 987; 1039 years ago
- Founder: Hugh Capet
- Final ruler: Joan II of Navarre
- Titles: King of France; King of Navarre
- Estates: France, Navarre
- Dissolution: 1328 (senior branch)

The House of Capet (French: Maison capétienne) ruled the Kingdom of France from 987 to 1328. It was the most senior line of the Capetian dynasty – itself a derivative dynasty from the Robertians and the Carolingians.

The direct line of the House of Capet came to an end in 1328, when the three sons of Philip IV (reigned 1285–1314) all failed to produce surviving male heirs to the French throne. With the death of Charles IV (reigned 1322–1328), the throne passed to the House of Valois, descended from a younger brother of Philip IV.

Royal power would pass on, in 1589, to another Capetian branch, the House of Bourbon, descended from the youngest son of Louis IX (reigned 1226–1270). From 1830 on the crown would go to a Bourbon cadet branch, the House of Orléans, always remaining in the hands of agnatic descendants of Hugh Capet, himself a descendant of Charlemagne, except for the reigns of Napoleon and Napoleon III.

== Names ==
The House of Capet (French: Maison capétienne) were also called the Direct Capetians (Capétiens directs), the House of France (la maison de France), or simply the Capets. Historians in the 19th century came to apply the name "Capetian" to both the ruling house of France and to the wider-spread male-line descendants of Hugh Capet (c. 941 – 996). Contemporaries did not use the name "Capetian" (see House of France). The Capets were sometimes called "the Third Race of Kings" (following the Merovingians and the Carolingians). The name "Capet" derives from the nickname (of uncertain meaning) given to Hugh, the first Capetian king.

== History ==
=== Early Capetian kings ===
The first Capetian monarch was Hugh Capet (c. 941–996), a Frankish nobleman from the Île-de-France, who, following the death of Louis V (c. 967–987) – the last Carolingian king – secured the throne of France by election. Hugh was a descendant of Charlemagne, through his son Pepin of Italy, and through them claimed descent from Constantine the Great. He then proceeded to make it hereditary in his family, by securing the election and coronation of his son, Robert II (972–1031), as co-king. The throne thus passed securely to Robert on his father's death, who followed the same custom – as did many of his early successors.

The Capetian kings were initially weak rulers of the kingdom – they directly ruled only small holdings in the Île-de-France and the Orléanais, all of which were plagued with disorder; the rest of France was controlled by potentates such as the duke of Normandy, the count of Blois, the duke of Burgundy (himself a Capetian after 1032) and the duke of Aquitaine (all of whom faced to a greater or lesser extent the same problems of controlling their subordinates). The House of Capet was, however, fortunate enough to have the support of the Church, and – with the exception of Philip I, Louis IX and the short-lived John I – were able to avoid the problems of underaged kingship.

=== Capetian and Plantagenet ===
Briefly, under Louis VII (1120–1180), the House of Capet rose in their power in France. Louis married Duchess Eleanor of Aquitaine (1122–1204) and so became duke – an advantage which had been eagerly grasped by his father, Louis VI (1081–1137), when Eleanor's father, William X, had asked of the king in his will to secure a good marriage for the young duchess. However, the marriage – and thus one avenue of Capetian aggrandisement – failed. The couple produced only two daughters, and suffered marital discord. Driven to secure the future of the house, Louis divorced Eleanor, who went on to marry Henry II of England (1133–1189). Louis married twice more before finally having a son, Philip II (1165–1223). Philip II started to break the power of the Plantagenets – the family of Eleanor and Henry II – in France.

Louis VIII (1187–1226) – the eldest son and heir of Philip Augustus – married Blanche of Castile (1188–1252), a granddaughter of Eleanor of Aquitaine and Henry II of England. In her name, he claimed the crown of England, invading at the invitation of the English barons, and briefly being acclaimed – though, it would later be stressed, not crowned – as king of England. However, the Capetians failed to establish themselves in England – Louis was forced to sign the Treaty of Lambeth, which legally decreed that he had never been king of England, and the prince reluctantly returned to his wife and father in France. More importantly for his dynasty, he would during his brief reign (1223–1226) conquer Poitou, and some of the lands of the Pays d'Oc, declared forfeit from their former owners by the pope as part of the Albigensian Crusade. These lands were added to the French crown, further empowering the Capetian family.

Louis IX (1214–1270) – Saint Louis – succeeded Louis VIII as a child; unable to rule for several years, the government of the realm was undertaken by his mother, the formidable Queen Blanche. She had originally been chosen by her grandmother, Eleanor, to marry the French heir, considered a more suitable queen than her sister Urraca; as regent, she proved this to be so, being associated in the kingship not only during her son's minority, but even after he came into his own. Louis, too, proved a largely acclaimed King – though he expended much money and effort on the Crusades, only for it to go to waste, as a French king he was admired for his austerity, strength, bravery, justice, and his devotion to France. Dynastically, he established two notable Capetian houses: the House of Anjou (which he created by bestowing the County of Anjou upon his brother, Charles I (1227–1285)), and the House of Bourbon (which he established by bestowing Clermont on his son Robert (1256–1317) in 1268, before marrying the young man to the heiress of Bourbon, Beatrice (1257–1310)); the first house would go on to rule Sicily, Naples, and Hungary; the second would eventually succeed to the French throne, collecting Navarre along the way.

=== Apogee of royal power ===
At the death of Louis IX (who shortly after was set upon the road to beatification), France under the Capetians stood as the pre-eminent power in Western Europe. This stance was largely continued, if not furthered, by his son Philip III (1245–1285), and his son Philip IV (1268–1314), both of whom ruled with the aid of advisors committed to the future of the House of Capet and of France, and both of whom made notable – for different reasons – dynastic marriages. Philip III married as his first wife Isabel (1247–1271), a daughter of King James I of Aragon (1208–1276); long after her death, he claimed the throne of Aragon for his second son, Charles (1270–1325), by virtue of Charles' descent via Isabel from the kings of Aragon. Unfortunately for the Capetians, the endeavour proved a failure, and the King himself died of dysentery at Perpignan, succeeded by his son, Philip IV.

Philip IV had married Joan I (1271–1305), the queen of Navarre and countess of Champagne. By this marriage, he added these domains to the French crown. He engaged in conflicts with the Papacy, eventually kidnapping Pope Boniface VIII (c. 1235–1303), and securing the appointment of the more sympathetic Frenchman, Bertrand de Goth (1264–1314), as Pope Clement V; and he boosted the power and wealth of the crown by abolishing the Order of the Temple, seizing its assets in 1307. More importantly to French history, he summoned the first Estates General – in 1302 – and in 1295 established the so-called "Auld Alliance" with the Scots, at the time resisting English domination. He died in 1314, less than a year after the execution of the Templar leaders – it was said that he had been summoned to appear before God by Jacques de Molay (died 1314), the Grand Master of the Templars, as the latter was burnt at the stake as a heretic; it was also said that de Molay had cursed the King and his family.

=== The succession crisis ===
Philip IV presided over the beginning of his House's end. The first quarter of the century saw each of Philip's sons reign in rapid succession: Louis X (1314–1316), Philip V (1316–1322) and Charles IV (1322–1328).

Having been informed that his daughters-in-law were engaging in adultery with two knights – according to some sources, he was told this by his own daughter, Isabella – he allegedly caught two of them in the act in 1313, and had all three shut up in royal prisons. Margaret (1290–1315), the wife of his eldest son and heir apparent, Louis X and I (1289–1316), had borne her husband only a daughter at this time, and the paternity of this girl, Joan, was with her mother's adultery now suspect. Accordingly, Louis – unwilling to release his wife and return to their marriage – needed to remarry. He arranged a marriage with his cousin, Clementia of Hungary (1293–1328), and after Queen Margaret conveniently died in 1315 (strangled by order of the King, some claimed), he swiftly remarried to Clementia. She was pregnant when he died a year later, after an unremarkable reign; uncertain of how to arrange the succession (the two main claimants being Louis' daughter Joan – the suspected bastard – and Louis' younger brother Philip (1293–1322), Count of Poitiers), the French set up a regency under the Count of Poitiers, and hoped that the child would be a boy. This proved the case, but the boy – King John I (1316), known as the Posthumous – died after only 5 days, leaving a succession crisis. Eventually, it was decided based on several legal reasons (later reinterpreted as Salic Law) that Joan was ineligible to inherit the throne, which passed to the Count of Poitiers, who became Philip V. He, however, produced no surviving sons with his wife, Countess Joan II of Burgundy (1291–1330), who had been cleared of her charges of adultery; thus, when he died in 1322, the crown passed to his brother, Charles (1294–1328), Count of La Marche, who became Charles IV; the County of Burgundy, brought to the Capetians by the marriage of Joan and Philip V, remained with Joan, and ceased to be part of the royal domains.

Charles IV swiftly divorced his adulterous wife, Blanche of Burgundy (c. 1296–1326) (sister of Countess Joan), who had given him no surviving children, and who had been locked up since 1313; in her place, he married Marie of Luxembourg (1304–1324), a daughter of Emperor Henry VII (c. 1275–1313). Marie died in 1324, giving birth to a stillborn son. He then remarried to his cousin, Joan of Évreux (1310–1371), who however bore him only daughters; when he died in 1328, his only child was Marie, a daughter by Joan, and the unborn child his wife was pregnant with. Philip of Valois (1293–1350), Count of Anjou and Valois, Charles' cousin, was set up as regent; when the Queen produced a daughter, Blanche, Philip by assent of the great magnates became Philip VI, of the House of Valois, cadet branch of the Capetian dynasty.

House of Capet during the 1314 Tour de Nesle affair succession crisis

Philip the Bold (1245–1285); Philip III, King of France r. 1270–1285
Joan of Navarre (1273–1305); Joan I, Queen of Navarre r. 1274–1305	Philip the Fair (1268–1314); Philip I, King of Navarre r. 1284–1305; Philip IV, King of France r. 1285–1314	Charles of Valois (1270–1325)
Louis the Quarreller (1289–1316); Louis I, King of Navarre r. 1305–1316; Louis X, King of France r. 1314–1316	Philip the Tall (1293–1322); Philip V, King of France r. 1316–1322; Philip II, King of Navarre r. 1316–1322	Charles the Fair; Charles the Bald (1294–1328); Charles IV, King of France r. 1322–1328; Charles I, King of Navarre r. 1322–1328	Isabella of France (c. 1295–1358)	Edward of Caernarfon (1284–1327); Edward II, King of England	Philip the Fortunate; Philip of Valois (1293–1350); Philip VI, King of France r. 1328–1350
John the Posthumous (1316); John I, King of France; John I, King of Navarre r. 1316	Joan of Navarre (1312–1349); Joan II, Queen of Navarre r. 1328–1349	Joan III (1308–1347); Countess of Burgundy	Edward of Windsor (1312–1377); Edward III, King of England	John the Good (1319–1364); John II, King of France r. 1350–1364
Charles the Bad (1332–1387); Charles II, King of Navarre r. 1349–1387	Joan of Valois (1343–1373)	Charles the Wise (1338–1380); Charles V, King of France r. 1364–1380

=== Last heirs ===
The last of the direct Capetians were the daughters of Philip IV's three sons, and Philip IV's daughter, Isabella. The wife of Edward II of England (1284–1327), Isabella (c. 1295–1358) overthrew her husband in favour of her son (Edward III, 1312–1377) ruling as regent with her cohort and lover (Roger Mortimer, 1st Earl of March, 1287–1330). On the death of her brother, Charles IV, in 1328 she claimed to be her father's heiress, and demanded the throne pass to her son (who as a male, an heir to Philip IV, and of adult age, was considered to have a good claim to the throne); however, her claim was refused, eventually providing a cause for the Hundred Years' War.

Joan (1312–1349), the daughter of Louis X, succeeded on the death of Charles IV to the throne of Navarre, she now being – questions of paternity aside – the unquestioned heiress. She was the last direct Capetian ruler of that kingdom, being succeeded by her son, Charles II of Navarre (1332–1387); his father, Philip of Évreux (1306–1343) had been a member of the Capetian House of Évreux. Mother and son both claimed on several occasions the throne of France, and later the Duchy of Burgundy.

Of the daughters of Philip V and Joan II of Burgundy, the elder two had surviving issue. Joan III, Countess of Burgundy (1308–1349), married Odo IV, Duke of Burgundy (1295–1350), uniting the Duchy and County of Burgundy. Her line became extinct with the death of her sole grandchild, Philip I, Duke of Burgundy (1346–1361), whose death also served to break the union between the Burgundys once more. Her sister, Margaret (1310–1382), married Louis I, Count of Flanders (1304–1346), and inherited the County of Burgundy after the death of Philip I; their granddaughter and heiress, Margaret III, Countess of Flanders (1350–1405), married the son of John II of France (1319–1364), Philip II, Duke of Burgundy (1342–1404), uniting the two domains once more.

Of Charles IV's children, only Blanche (1328–1393) – the youngest, the baby whose birth marked the end of the House of Capet – survived childhood. She married Philip of Valois, Duke of Orléans (1336–1375), the son of Philip VI, but they produced no children. With her death in 1382, the House of Capet finally came to an end.

Royal families involved in the Hundred Years' War (1337–1453)

Valois (Capet)	Plantagenet	Blois	Capet	Évreux (Capet)
Charles; Count of Valois	Edward I "Longshanks"; King of England r. 1272–1307	Joan I Queen of Navarre r. 1274–1305	Philip IV "the Fair"; King of France r. 1285–1314; Philip I King of Navarre r. 1284–1305	Louis; Count of Évreux
Edward II; King of England r. 1307–1327	Isabella "She-Wolf of France"	Louis X King of France r. 1314–1316; Louis I King of Navarre r. 1305–1316	Philip V "the Tall"; King of France; Philip II; King of Navarre r. 1316–1322	Charles IV "the Fair"; King of France; Charles I "the Bald"; King of Navarre r. 1322–1328	Joan of Évreux
Philip VI "the Fortunate" "of Valois"; King of France r. 1328–1350	Joan of Valois	John I "the Posthumous"; King of France; King of Navarre r. 1316	Joan II; Queen of Navarre r. 1328–1349	Philip III "the Noble" "the Wise"; King of Navarre jure uxoris r. 1328–1343
John II "the Good"; King of France r. 1350–1364	Philippa of Hainault	Edward III; King of England r. 1327–1377	Joan of the Tower	David II; King of Scotland r. 1329–1371	Charles II "the Bad"; King of Navarre r. 1349–1387
Charles V "the Wise"; King of France r. 1364–1380	Philip the Bold; Duke of Burgundy	Edward of Woodstock "The Black Prince"	John of Gaunt	Edmund of Langley; Duke of York
Luxembourg
Charles VI "the Beloved" "the Mad"; King of France r. 1380–1422	Louis I Duke of Orléans	Charles IV; Holy Roman Emperor r. 1355–1378	Henry IV; King of England r. 1399–1413
Charles VII "the Victorious"; King of France r. 1422–1461	Isabella of Valois	Richard II; King of England r. 1377–1399	Anne of Bohemia	Catherine of Valois	Henry V King of England r. 1413–1422	Thomas of Lancaster; Duke of Clarence †Battle of Baugé
Henry VI; King of England r. 1422–1461, r. 1470–1471

== List of direct Capetian kings of France ==
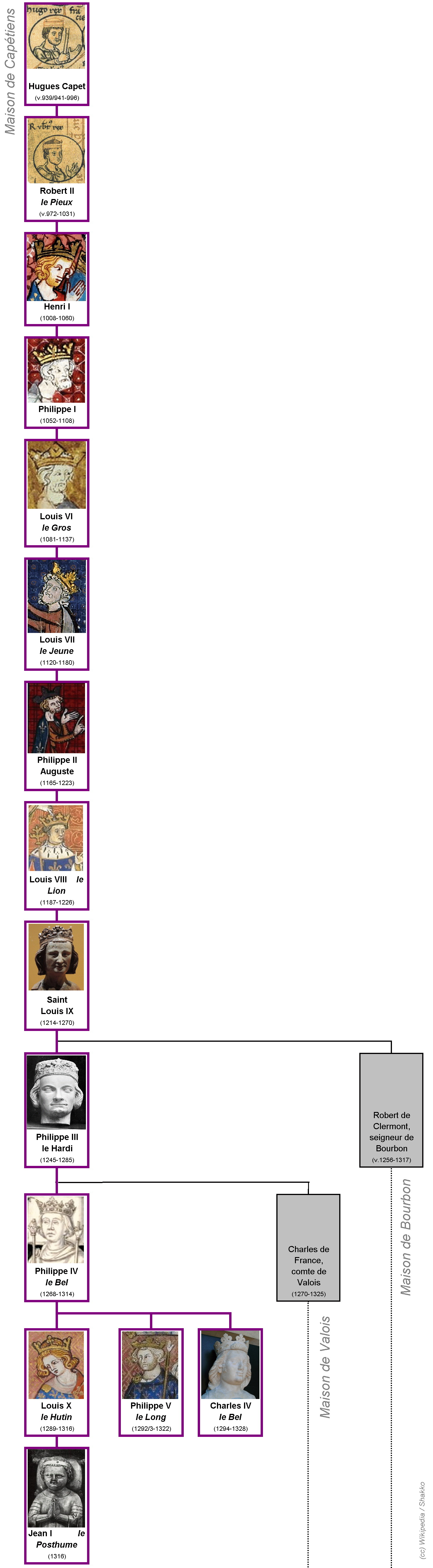

- 987–996, Hugh Capet (Hugues Capet), Count of Paris, crowned King of the Franks
- 996–1031, Robert II, the Pious (Robert II le Pieux)
- 1031–1060, Henry I (Henri Ier)
- 1060–1108, Philip I (Philippe Ier)
- 1108–1137, Louis VI, the Fat (Louis VI le Gros)
- 1137–1180, Louis VII, the Young (Louis VII le Jeune)
- 1180–1223, Philip II Augustus, the God-Given (Philippe II Auguste Dieudonné)
- 1223–1226, Louis VIII, the Lion (Louis VIII le Lion)
- 1226–1270, Louis IX, the Saint, ("Saint Louis") (Louis IX le Saint, Saint Louis)
- 1270–1285, Philip III, the Bold (Philippe III le Hardi)
- 1285–1314, Philip IV, the Fair (Philippe IV le Bel)
- 1314–1316, Louis X, the Quarrelsome (Louis X le Hutin)
- 1316–1316, John I, the Posthumous (Jean Ier le Posthume)
- 1316–1322, Philip V, the Tall (Philippe V le Long)
- 1322–1328, Charles IV, the Fair (Charles IV le Bel)

== List of direct Capetian kings and queens of Navarre ==
- 1285–1314, Philip I, the Fair (Philip IV of France), husband of Queen Joan I of Navarre
- 1314–1316, Louis I, the Quarrelsome (Louis X of France)
- 1316–1316, John I, the Posthumous (John I of France)
- 1316–1322, Philip II, the Tall (Philip V of France)
- 1322–1328, Charles I, the Fair (Charles IV of France)
- 1328–1349, Joan II

== Sources ==
- MacLagan, Michael; Louda, Jiri (1984). Lines of Succession: Heraldry of the Royal Families of Europe. London: Orbis. ISBN 978-0-85613-672-6.
- Gwatkin, H. M., Whitney, J. P. (ed) et al. (1926) The Cambridge Medieval History: Volume III. Cambridge: Cambridge University Press.
- Hallam, Elizabeth M.; Everard, Judith (2001). Capetian France, 987–1328 (second ed.). Harlow, UK: Longman. ISBN 978-0-582-40428-1.

== See also ==
- France in the Middle Ages
- French monarchs family tree
- List of French monarchs
- List of Navarrese monarchs from the Capetian dynasty
- Navarre monarchs family tree
- Cape

— Royal house — House of Capet Cadet branch of the Robertian dynasty
Preceded by Carolingian dynasty	Ruling house of France; 987–1328	Succeeded by House of Valois
Preceded by House of Champagne	Ruling house of Navarre; 1284–1349	Succeeded by House of Évreux
