= Philippe I =

Philippe I may refer to:

- Philippe of Belgium
- Philippe I of France
- Philippe I de Croÿ
- Philippe I, Duke of Orléans
