= Philip I of Auvergne =

Philip I
- Coat of arms of Philip of Burgundy

Count of Auvergne and Boulogne with Joan I
- Reign: 1338 - 1346
- Predecessor: Joan I as sole ruler
- Successor: Joan I as sole ruler
- Born: 10 November 1323
- Died: 10 August 1346 (aged 22)
- Spouse: Joan I, Countess of Auvergne
- Issue: Philip I, Duke of Burgundy
- House: Burgundy
- Father: Odo IV, Duke of Burgundy
- Mother: Joan III, Countess of Burgundy

Philip of Burgundy (10 November 1323 – 10 August 1346) was Count of Auvergne and Boulogne (as Philip I) in right of his wife. He died during the Siege of Aiguillon.

== Biography ==
Philip, born 10 November 1323, was the only son and heir of Odo IV, Duke of Burgundy, and of Joan III, Countess of Burgundy, daughter of King Philip V of France and Joan II, Countess of Burgundy. He married Joan I, Countess of Auvergne and Boulogne, in c. 1338.

In 1340, Philip and his father defended the city of Saint-Omer against the assaults of Robert III of Artois. In 1346, he participated in the siege of Aiguillon, led by John, Duke of Normandy. It was during this siege that Philip died, after falling from his horse.

Philip had no other sons from his marriage to Joan. The House of Burgundy was then placed in the hands of his young son Philip (1346–1361), who died childless. After the death of the younger Philip, the dukedom of Burgundy became a part of the French crown, and was granted by John II of France to his youngest son, Philip the Bold.

Philip's daughter, Joan (1344 – 11 September 1360), was betrothed to Amadeus VI, Count of Savoy from 1347 to 1355, and was raised at his court. When she was released from the engagement at age 10, she entered a convent at Poissy, where she remained for her final years.

== See also ==
- Duchy of Burgundy
- Dukes of Burgundy family tree
- List of horse accidents

== Sources ==
- Cox, Eugene L. (1967). The Green Count of Savoy. Princeton, New Jersey: Princeton University Press. LCCN 67-11030.
- Le Bel, Jean (2011). The True Chronicles of Jean Le Bel, 1290-1360. Translated by Bryant, Nigel. Boydell & Brewer.
- Ormrod, W. Mark (2011). Edward III. Yale University Press.
- Vaughan, Richard (2005). Philip the Bold: The Formation of the Burgundian State. Vol. 1. The Boydell Press.

Regnal titles
Preceded by Joan I as sole ruler	Count of Auvergne and Boulogne with Joan I 1338–1346	Succeeded by Joan I as sole ruler
