= Margaret I of Burgundy =

Countess of Burgundy and Artois from 1361 to 1382

Margaret I
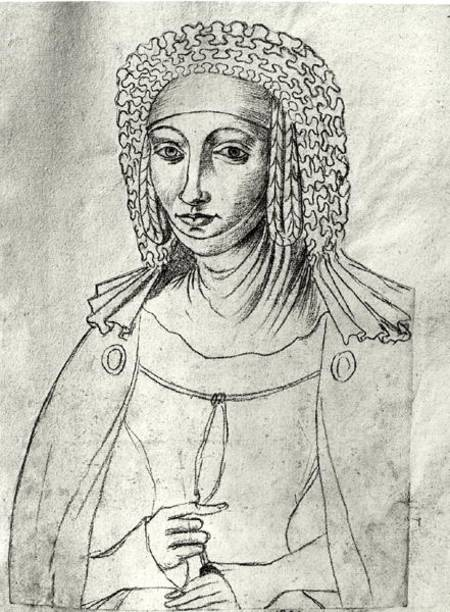

Countess of Burgundy and Artois
- Reign: 1361–1382
- Predecessor: Philip of Rouvres
- Successor: Louis of Male
- Born: 1310
- Died: 9 May 1382 (aged 71–72)
- Spouse: Louis I, Count of Flanders (m. 1320; died 1346)
- Issue: Louis II, Count of Flanders
- House: Capet
- Father: Philip V, King of France
- Mother: Joan II, Countess of Burgundy

Margaret I (French: Marguerite; 1310 – 9 May 1382) was a Capetian princess who ruled as Countess of Burgundy and Artois from 1361 until her death. She was also countess of Flanders, Nevers and Rethel by marriage to Louis I of Flanders, and regent of Flanders during the minority of her son, Louis II, in 1346.

== Family ==
Margaret was born in 1310, the second daughter of Countess Joan II of Burgundy and Philip, Count of Poitiers. Her father ascended the French throne in 1316 as Philip V of France. In 1320, Margaret married Count Louis I of Flanders. Her husband was dependent on her father in suppressing the rebellion of Nicolaas Zannekin. King Philip died in 1322, and the crown was inherited by her uncle, King Charles IV.

Margaret's mother, Joan II, succeeded her own mother, Mahaut, as countess of Artois in 1329. Margaret's elder sister, Joan III, inherited the counties of Artois and Burgundy when their mother died in 1330.

== Rule ==
Margaret's husband was killed in the Battle of Crécy on 26 August 1346. He and Margaret had one son, Count Louis II of Flanders, who succeeded his father and for whom she acted as a regent in the beginning of his reign.

In 1357, Margaret's granddaughter, Margaret, then seven years old, was married to Duke Philip I of Burgundy, grandson and heir of Margaret's sister. They were childless and, upon his death in 1361, the elder Margaret succeeded to the comital thrones of Artois and Burgundy.

In 1369, the younger Margaret married Philip the Bold, youngest son of King John II of France. According to Guizot, whilst Margaret I favoured the marriage of her granddaughter to Philip the Bold, the girl's father, Louis II, and the Flemish communes, preferring England to France, were unwilling to arrange the marriage. Reputedly, Margaret, vexed at the ill will of the count her son, had one day said to him, as she tore open her dress before his eyes, "Since you will not yield to your mother's wishes, I will cut off these breasts which gave suck to you, to you and to no other, and will throw them to the dogs to devour." Louis, persuaded, agreed to the marriage.

The unrest in coastal Low Countries escalated to open rebellions in Margaret's last years. A revolt in Ghent was put down by joint operation of Margaret's son and grandson-in-law. However, after the Battle of Beverhoutsveld, Louis II was expelled from Flanders by the Flemings under Philip van Artevelde. A French army (and Philip the Bold) came to help them regain Flanders, and the revolting Flemings were decisively defeated at the Battle of Roosebeke, the year in which Margaret died. However, the citizens of Ghent continued to resist with English aid, and it was left to her granddaughter and grandson-in-law to subdue the town.

== Death ==
Countess Margaret died in 1382, leaving her cousin Blanche as the final surviving Capetian. Her counties were inherited by her only son, Louis, who died two years later. In 1384, all her possessions, together with Flanders and the rest of Louis' inheritance, went to her only surviving grandchild, Margaret III of Flanders.

== Sources ==
- George, Hereford Brooke (1875). Genealogical Tables Illustrative of Modern History. Oxford Clarendon Press.
- Henneman, John Bell (1971). Royal Taxation in Fourteenth-Century France: The Development of War Financing, 1322-1359. Princeton University Press. ISBN 9780691051888.

Margaret I of Burgundy House of Capet Born: 1310 Died: 9 May 1382
Regnal titles
Preceded by Philip of Rouvres	Countess Palatine of Burgundy; Countess of Artois; 1361–1382	Succeeded by Louis of Male
