= Count of Artois =

French noble title

- Creation date: 850; 1176 years ago (fief); 1681; 345 years ago (courtesy title)
- Peerage: Peerage of France
- First holder: Odalric
- Last holder: Francis II, Holy Roman Emperor (fief); Charles, Count of Artois (courtesy title)
- Status: Extinct
- Extinction date: November 6, 1836; 190 years ago

The count of Artois (French: Comte d'Artois, Dutch: Graaf van Artesië) was the ruler over the County of Artois from the 9th century until the abolition of the countship by the French revolutionaries in 1790.

== House of Artois ==
- Odalric (c. 850s)
- Altmar (c. 890s)
- Adelelm (?–932)
- Conquered by Arnulf I of Flanders and directly under Flanders, 932–1180
- Philip I of Flanders (1168–1180), gave Artois as dowry to Isabelle of Hainaut, niece of Philip of Flanders, for her marriage to Philip II of France

== House of Capet ==
- Isabella (1180–1190)
- Louis VIII of France (1190–1223), her son

Merged into royal domain.

== House of Capet, Artois branch ==
- Robert I (1237–1250), his second surviving son
- Robert II (1250–1302), his son
- Matilda (1302–1329), his daughter, married to Otto IV of Burgundy
  - contested by Robert III (1302–1329)

== House of Burgundy ==
- Joan I (1329–1330), her daughter
- Joan II (1330–1347), her daughter
  - married to Odo (1330–1347)
- Philip of Rouvres, Duke of Burgundy (1347–1361), their grandson, as Philip III

== House of Capet ==
- Margaret I (1361–1382), his great-aunt

== House of Dampierre ==
- Louis III (1382–1383), her son
- Margaret II (1383–1405), his daughter
  - married to Philip the Bold, Duke of Burgundy (1383–1404), as Philip IV

== House of Capet, Valois-Burgundy branch ==
- John the Fearless (1405–1419)
- Philip the Good (1419–1467), as Philip V
- Charles the Bold (1467–1477), as Charles I
- Mary the Rich (1477–1482)
  - married to Maximilian I, Holy Roman Emperor (1477–1482)
  - Occupied by France between 1477 and 1493 (Treaty of Senlis)

== House of Habsburg ==
- Philip the Handsome, King of Castile (1482–1506), as Philip VI
- Charles V, Holy Roman Emperor (1506–1556), as Charles II
- Philip II of Spain (1556–1598), as Philip VII
- Isabella Clara Eugenia and Albert (1598–1621)
- Philip IV of Spain (1621–1659), as Philip VIII
- ceded to France by the Treaty of the Pyrenees (1659)
- Charles II of Spain (1665–1700) as Charles III

=== House of Bourbon, claimants of the title (1700–1713) ===
- Philip IX (King Philip V of Spain) 1700–1713

=== House of Habsburg (1713–present) ===
- Charles IV (Emperor Charles VI) 1713–1740
- Maria Theresa 1740–1780
  - Francis I (Emperor Francis I) (1740–1765 with his wife, titular only)
- Joseph (Emperor Joseph II) (1780–1790, titular only)
- Leopold (Emperor Leopold II) (1790–1792, titular only)
- Francis II (Emperor Francis II) (1792–1795/1835)
- Ferdinand (Emperor Ferdinand I) (1835–1848, titular only)
- Franz Joseph (Emperor Franz Joseph I) (1848–1916, titular only)
- Charles V (Emperor Charles I) (1916–1918, titular only, later renounced)

== House of Capet, Bourbon line ==
- Charles X of France (1757–1836)
