= Joan II of Burgundy =

Queen of France and Navarre from 1316 to 1322

Joan II
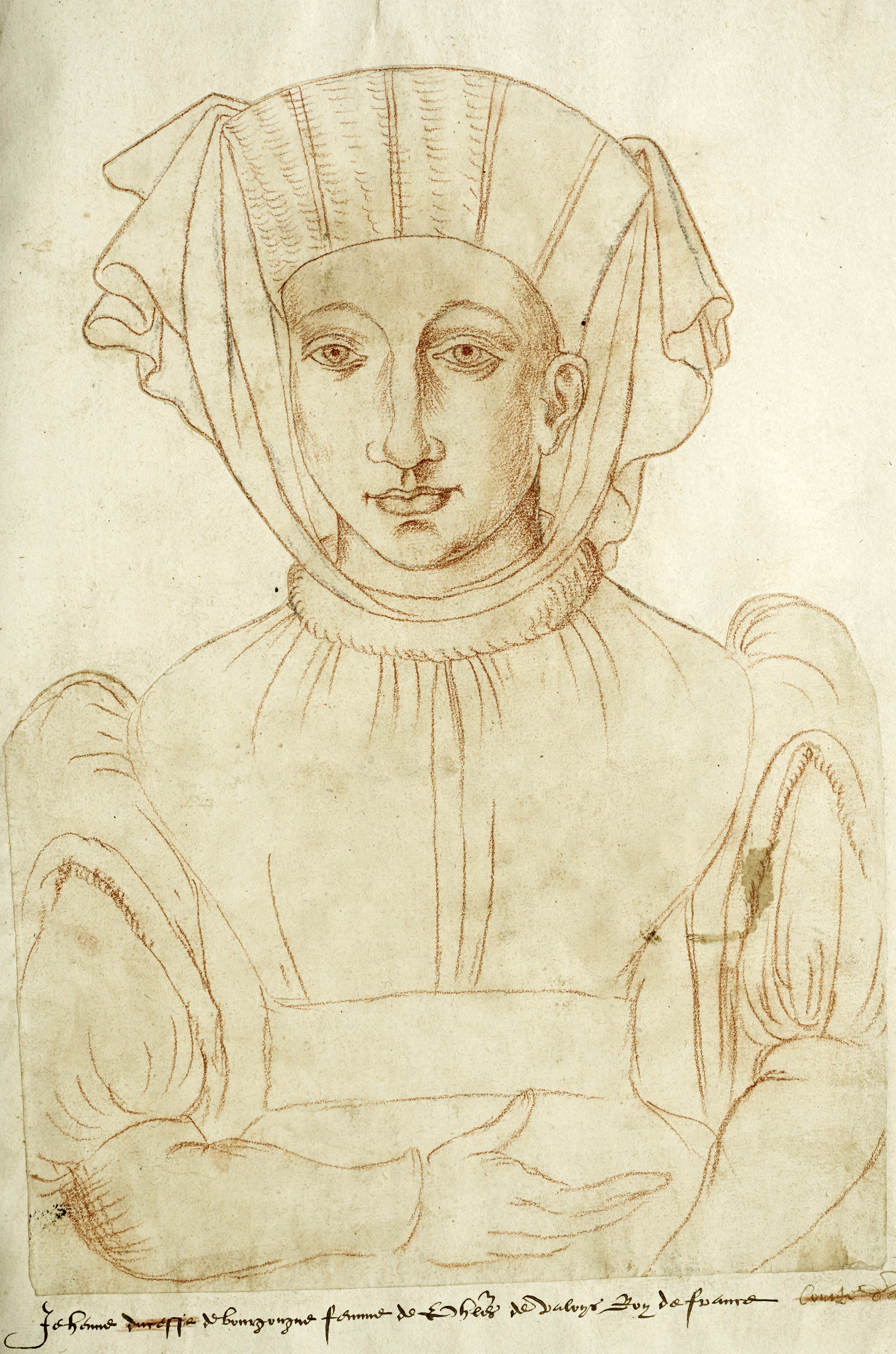

Countess of Burgundy
- Reign: 17 March 1303 – 21 January 1330
- Predecessor: Otto IV
- Successor: Joan III

Queen consort of France and Navarre
- Tenure: 20 November 1316 – 3 January 1322
- Coronation: 9 January 1317

Countess of Artois
- Reign: 27 November 1329 – 21 January 1330
- Predecessor: Mahaut
- Successor: Joan III
- Born: c. 1291
- Died: 21 January 1330 (aged 38–39); Roye-en-Artois
- Burial: Saint Denis Basilica
- Spouse: Philip V of France (m. 1307; died 1322)
- Issue: Joan III, Countess of Burgundy; Margaret I, Countess of Burgundy; Isabelle, Dauphine of Viennois; Blanche
- House: Ivrea
- Father: Otto IV, Count of Burgundy
- Mother: Mahaut, Countess of Artois

Joan II (French: Jeanne; c. 1287/88 (Note: Brown states Van Kerrenbrouck gives 1294 as her date of birth.) – 21 January 1330), was, in her own right, the countess of Burgundy from 1303 and of Artois from 1329 until her death as well as the queen of France by marriage to Philip V from 1316 to 1322.

== Biography ==
Coat of arms of Joan II.

Joan, born c. 1287/88, was the eldest daughter and heiress of Otto IV, Count of Burgundy, and Mahaut, Countess of Artois. She married Philip, the second son of King Philip IV of France, on 21 January 1307. At the beginning of 1314, Joan's sister Blanche and her sister-in-law Margaret were convicted of adultery with two knights, upon the testimony of their sister-in-law Isabella, in the Tour de Nesle affair. Joan was thought to have known of the affairs, and was placed under house arrest at Dourdan as punishment. She was cleared, by parliament, and released following the death of King Philip IV.

== Queen ==
With the death of King John I of France in 1316, Joan's husband became King Philip V of France and she became queen consort.

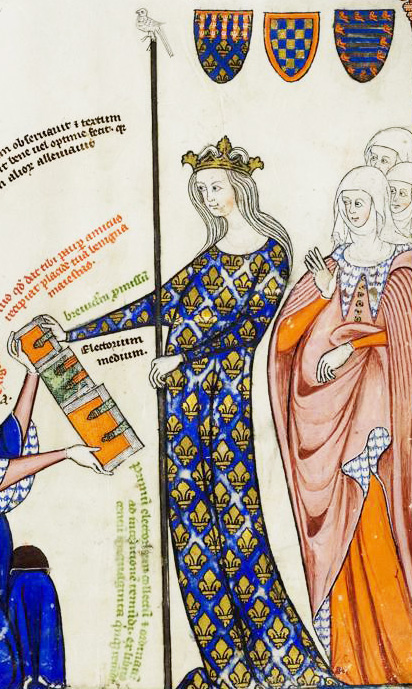
Joan as queen of France from a 14th-century manuscript

=== Countess of Burgundy and Artois ===
Upon her father's death in 1303, with her only brother Robert disinherited by the Treaty of Vincennes (1295), the County of Burgundy was inherited by Joan under the regency of her mother. When she married in 1307, her mother continued to govern her domains for her during her absence.

After her husband's death in 1322, Joan lived in her own domains. After Joan's beloved sister, Blanche, died in 1326, she was said to be "so sorrowful as never before she had been."

In 1329, she inherited her mother's County of Artois.

=== Death ===
Joan died at Roye-en-Artois, on 21 January 1330, and was buried at Cordeliers Convent in Paris. Her titles were inherited by her eldest daughter, Joan III, who had married Odo IV, Duke of Burgundy, in 1318. With Joan II's death, the County and Duchy of Burgundy became united through this marriage. The Counties of Burgundy and Artois were eventually inherited by her younger daughter Margaret in 1361.

Joan left provision in her will for the founding of a college in Paris; it was named Collège de Bourgogne, "Burgundy College."

== Issue ==
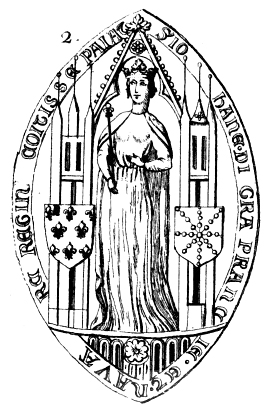
The seal of Joan II

Joan and Philip had:

1. Joan (1/2 May 1308 – 10/15 August 1349), Countess of Burgundy and Artois in her own right and wife of Odo IV, Duke of Burgundy
2. Margaret (1309 – 9 May 1382), wife of Louis I of Flanders
3. Isabelle (1310 – April 1348), wife of Guigues VIII de La Tour du Pin, Dauphin de Viennois.
4. Blanche (1313 – 26 April 1358), a nun
5. Louis (d. 1317) (Note: Bradbury says he was known as Philip Louis)

== In fiction ==
Joan (as Jeanne) is a character in Les Rois maudits (The Accursed Kings), a series of French historical novels by Maurice Druon. She was portrayed by Catherine Rich in the 1972 French miniseries adaptation of the series, and by Julie Depardieu in the 2005 adaptation.

== See also ==
- Joan of Burgundy (disambiguation)

== Sources ==
- Bradbury, Jim (2007). The Capetians: Kings of France 987-1328. Hambledon Continuum.
- Brown, Elizabeth A.R. (2009). "Blanche of Artois and Burgundy, Chateau-Gaillard, and the Baron de Joursanvault". In Smith, Katherine Allen; Wells, Scott (eds.). Negotiating community and difference in medieval Europe: gender, power, patronage, and the authority of religion in Latin Christendom. BRILL.
- Gaude-Ferragu, Murielle (2016). Queenship in Medieval France, 1300-1500. Palgrave Macmillan.
- Hallam, Elizabeth (1980). Capetian France, 987-1328. Longman.
- Warner, Kathryn (2017). Isabella of France: The Rebel Queen. Amberley Press.

Joan II of Burgundy House of Ivrea Born: c. 1291 Died: 21 January 1330
French nobility
Preceded by Otto IV	Countess Palatine of Burgundy; 1303–1330; With: Philip II (1307–1322)	Succeeded by Joan III
Preceded by Matilda	Countess of Artois; 1329–1330	Succeeded by Joan III
French royalty
Vacant Title last held by Clementia of Hungary	Queen consort of France and Navarre; 1316–1322	Succeeded by Blanche of Burgundy
