= John I of France =

King of France and Navarre in 1316

John I
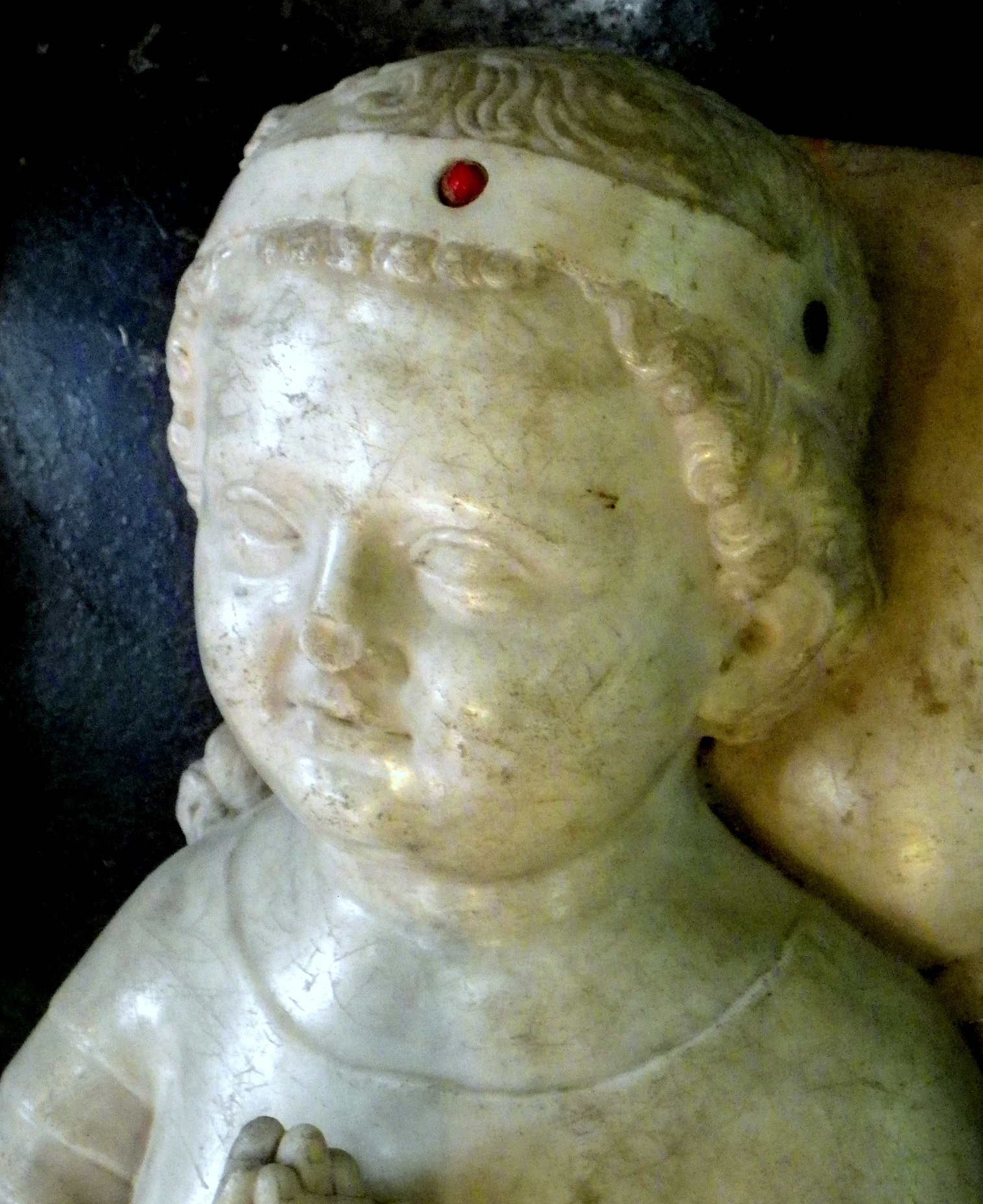
- Tomb effigy of John at the Basilica of Saint-Denis

King of France and Navarre
- Reign: 15 – 19 November 1316
- Predecessor: Louis X and I
- Successor: Philip V and II
- Regent: Philip, Count of Poitiers
- Born: 15 November 1316; Paris, France
- Died: 19 November 1316 (aged 4 days); Paris, France
- Burial: Saint Denis Basilica
- House: Capet
- Father: Louis X of France
- Mother: Clementia of Hungary

John I (15 November 1316 – 19 November 1316), (Note: These are the dates given by the continuator of Guillaume de Nangis. The Chronique Parisienne Anonyme de 1316 à 1339 gives 13 and 18 November. His burial took place on Sunday 20 according to the same source, although the 20th was actually a Saturday.) called the Posthumous (French: Jean I le Posthume, Occitan: Joan I lo Postume), was the King of France and Navarre, as the posthumous son and successor of Louis X, for the four days he lived in 1316. He is the youngest person to be king of France, the only one to have been king from birth, and the only one to hold the title for his entire life. His reign is the shortest of any undisputed French king. Although considered as a king today, his status was not recognized until chroniclers and historians in later centuries began numbering John II, thereby acknowledging John I's brief reign.

John reigned for four days under the regency of his uncle, Philip V of France, until his death on 19 November 1316. His death ended the three centuries of father-to-son succession to the French throne. The infant king was buried in the Basilica of Saint-Denis. He was succeeded by his uncle, Philip, whose contested legitimacy led to the re-affirmation of the Salic law, which excluded women from the line of succession to the French throne.

== Consequences ==
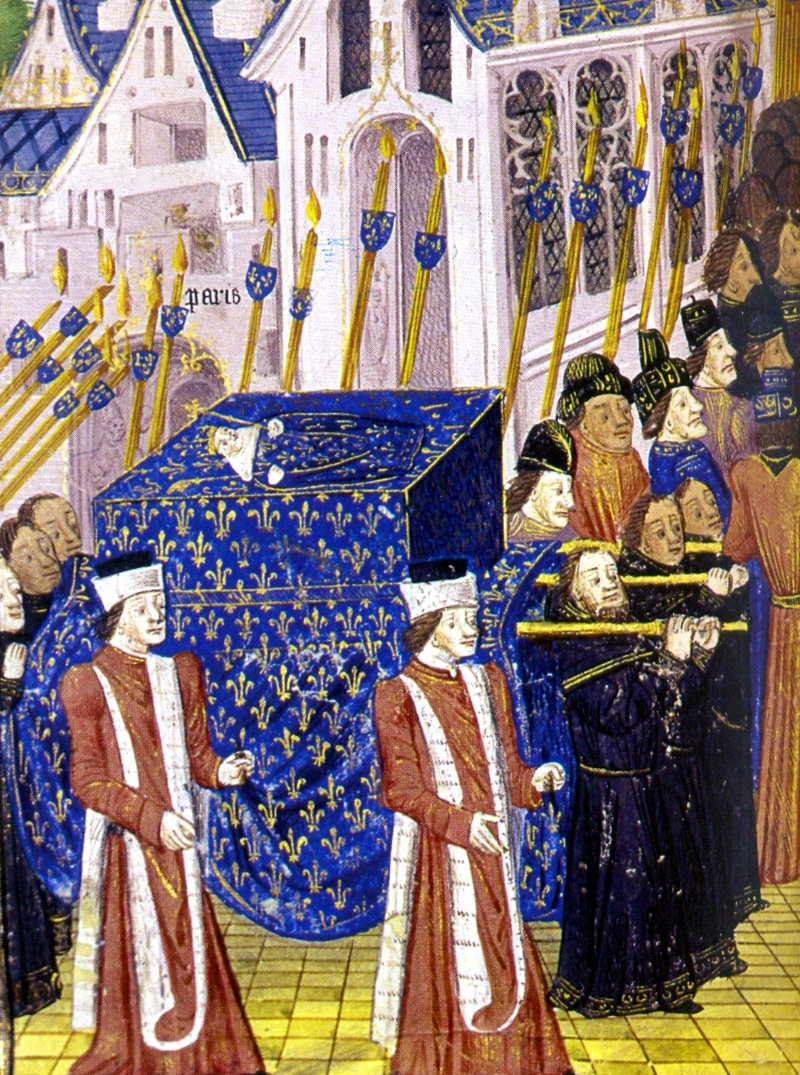
Funerary convoy of John I

The child mortality rate was very high in medieval Europe and John may have died from any number of causes, but rumours of poisoning spread immediately after his death (including one which said that he had been murdered with a pin by his aunt), as many people benefited from it, and as John's father had also died in strange circumstances. The cause of his death is still not known today.

The premature death of John brought the first issue of succession of the Capetian dynasty. When Louis X, his father, died without a son to succeed him, it was the first time since Hugh Capet that the succession from father to son of the kings of France was interrupted. It was then decided to wait until his pregnant widow, Clementia of Hungary, delivered the child. The king's brother, Philip the Tall, was in charge of the regency of the kingdom against his uncle Charles of Valois. The birth of a male child was expected to give France its king. The problem of succession returned when John died four days after birth. Philip ascended the throne at the expense of John's four-year-old half-sister, Joan, daughter of Louis X and Margaret of Burgundy.

== Supposed survival ==
Various legends circulated about this royal child. First, it was claimed that his uncle, Philip the Tall, had him poisoned. Then, a strange story a few decades later started the rumor that the little King John was not dead. During the captivity of John the Good (1356–1360), a man named Giannino Baglioni claimed to be John I and thus the heir to the throne. He tried to assert his rights, but was captured in Provence and died in captivity in 1363.

In The Man Who Believed He Was King of France, Tommaso di Carpegna Falconieri suggests that Cola di Rienzo manufactured false evidence that Baglioni was John the Posthumous in order to strengthen his own power in Rome by placing Baglioni on the French throne. Shortly after they met in 1354, di Rienzo was assassinated, and Baglioni waited two years to report his claims. He went to the Hungarian court where Louis I of Hungary, nephew of Clementia of Hungary, allegedly recognized him as the son of Louis and Clementia. In 1360, Baglioni went to Avignon, but Pope Innocent VI refused to receive him. After several attempts to gain recognition, he was arrested and imprisoned in Naples, where he died in 1363.

Maurice Druon's historical novel series Les Rois maudits dramatises this theory and develops it as a major plotline throughout the series. In La Loi des mâles (1957), the infant John is temporarily switched with the child of Guccio Baglioni and Marie de Cressay as a decoy by Hugues de Bouville, former chamberlain to Philip IV and protector of the child, and his wife. This child, mistaken for John, is subsequently poisoned by Mahaut, Countess of Artois, in order to place John's uncle (and Mahaut's son-in-law), Philippe, Count of Poitiers, on the throne. Marie is coerced into secretly raising John as her own son, named Giannino Baglioni. An adult Giannino was portrayed by Jean-Gérard Sandoz in the 1972 French miniseries adaptation of the series, and by Lorand Stoica in the 2005 adaptation.

== See also ==
- List of shortest-reigning monarchs

John I of France House of Capet Born: 15 November 1316 Died: 19 November 1316
Regnal titles
Vacant Title last held by Louis the Quarreler	King of France and Navarre; 15 November – 19 November 1316	Succeeded by Philip the Tall
