= Philip of Rouvres =

Philip
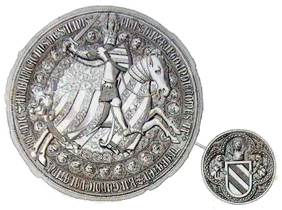

Duke of Burgundy
- Reign: 1349 – 21 November 1361
- Predecessor: Odo IV
- Successor: Philip II

Count of Auvergne and Boulogne
- Reign: 1360 – 21 November 1361
- Predecessor: Joan I
- Successor: John I

Count of Burgundy and Artois
- Reign: 1347 – 21 November 1361
- Predecessor: Joan III
- Successor: Margaret I
- Born: 1346; Rouvres-en-Plaine Castle
- Died: 21 November 1361 (aged 14–15); Rouvres-en-Plaine Castle
- Spouse: Margaret III, Countess of Flanders
- House: Burgundy
- Father: Philip of Burgundy
- Mother: Joan I, Countess of Auvergne

Philip of Rouvres (1346 – 21 November 1361) was the Count of Burgundy (as Philip II) and Count of Artois (as Philip III) from 1347, Duke of Burgundy (as Philip I) from 1349, and Count of Auvergne and Boulogne (as Philip III) from 1360. He was the only son of Philip, heir to the Duchy of Burgundy, and Joan I, heiress of Auvergne and Boulogne.

== Biography ==
Philip succeeded his grandmother in the County of Burgundy (Franche-Comté) and Artois when he was only one year old. He succeeded his grandfather when he was only three. His deceased father was the only child of Odo IV, Duke of Burgundy, and of Joan III, Countess of Burgundy and Artois. In 1355, Philip married Margaret, daughter of Louis de Mâle, Count of Flanders.

Philip, in his own right, held the counties of Artois and Burgundy from 1349 (inherited from his grandmother), the Duchy of Burgundy from 1349 (inherited from his grandfather) and the counties of Auvergne and Boulogne from 1360 (inherited from his mother). At eight years old, in 1357, by marrying the future Margaret III, Countess of Flanders, then heiress of Flanders, he was promised the counties of Flanders, Nevers, Rethel and Antwerp, and the duchies of Brabant and Limburg. Most of these lands were located in the Low Countries.

His mother Joanna, who became Queen of France after her remarriage to King John II of France, governed Burgundy as Philip's guardian until her death in September 1360. Philip was declared of age on 20 October the same year.

== Death and succession ==
In 1361 at the age of 15, Philip died, either of the plague or from injuries suffered in a riding accident, before he could consummate his marriage to Margaret. With his death, King John II of France claimed the duchy for the kingdom of France, making his youngest son Philip the Bold royal lieutenant-general by 27 June 1363 and duke of Burgundy by June 1364.

== See also ==
- Duke of Burgundy

== Sources ==
- Blockmans, Wim; Prevenier, Walter (1999). Peters, Edward (ed.). The Promised Lands: The Low Countries Under Burgundian Rule, 1369–1530. Translated by Fackelman, Elizabeth. University of Pennsylvania Press.
- De Winter, Patrick M. (1983). "Castles and Town Residences of Philip the Bold, Duke of Burgundy (1364–1404)". Artibus et Historiae. 4 (8). IRSA s.c.: 95–118. doi:10.2307/1483216. JSTOR 1483216.
- Jackson, Guida M. (1999). Women Rulers Throughout the Ages: An Illustrated Guide. ABC-CLIO.
- Ormrod, W. Mark (2011). Edward III. Yale University Press.
- Sumption, Jonathan (1999). The Hundred Years War: Trial by Fire. Vol. II. University of Pennsylvania Press.
- Vaughan, Richard (2005). Philip the Bold. Vol. 1: The Formation of the Burgundian State. The Boydell Press.

Philip of Rouvres House of Burgundy Born: 1346 Died: 21 November 1361
Preceded by Odo IV	Duke of Burgundy; 1349 – 21 November 1361	Succeeded by John II of France (as John I)
Preceded by Joan III	Count of Artois and Burgundy; 1347 – 21 November 1361	Succeeded by Margaret I
Preceded by Joan I	Count of Auvergne and Boulogne; 1360 – 21 November 1361	Succeeded by John I
