= Philip V of France =

King of France and Navarre from 1316 to 1322

Philip V
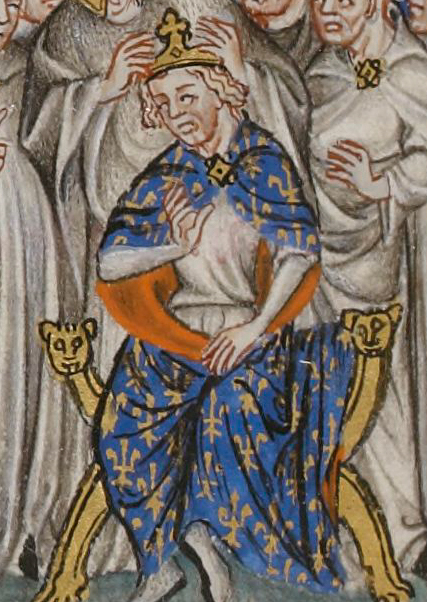
- Contemporary miniature depicting the coronation of Philip V, from the Grandes Chroniques de France

King of France and Navarre
- Reign: 20 November 1316 – 3 January 1322
- Coronation: 9 January 1317
- Predecessor: John I
- Successor: Charles IV and I
- Born: c. 1291; Lyon, France
- Died: 3 January 1322 (aged 30–31); Abbey of Longchamp, Bois de Boulogne, Paris, France
- Burial: 8 January 1322; Saint Denis Basilica
- Spouse: Joan II, Countess of Burgundy (m. 1307)
- Issue: Joan III, Countess of Burgundy; Margaret I, Countess of Burgundy; Isabelle, Dauphine of Viennois; Blanche of France
- House: Capet
- Father: Philip IV of France
- Mother: Joan I of Navarre

Philip V (c. 1291 – 3 January 1322), known as the Tall (French: Philippe le Long), was King of France and Navarre (as Philip II) from 1316 to 1322. Philip engaged in a series of domestic reforms intended to improve the management of the kingdom. These reforms included the creation of an independent Court of Finances, the standardization of weights and measures, and the establishment of a single currency.

Philip was the second son of King Philip IV of France and Queen Joan I of Navarre. He was granted an appanage, the County of Poitiers, while his elder brother, Louis X, inherited the French and Navarrese thrones. When Louis died in 1316, he left a daughter and a pregnant wife, Clementia of Hungary. Philip the Tall successfully claimed the regency. Queen Clementia gave birth to a boy, who was proclaimed king as John I, but the infant king lived only for four days.

At the death of his nephew, Philip immediately had himself crowned at Reims. However, his legitimacy was challenged by the party of Louis X's daughter Joan. Philip V successfully contested her claims for a number of reasons, including her youth, doubts regarding her paternity (her mother was involved in the Tour de Nesle Affair), and the Estates General's determination that women should be excluded from the line of succession to the French throne. The succession of Philip, instead of Joan, set the precedent for the French royal succession that would be known as the Salic law.

Philip restored somewhat good relations with the County of Flanders, which had entered into open rebellion during his father's rule, but simultaneously his relations with his brother-in-law Edward II of England worsened as Edward, who was also Duke of Guyenne, initially refused to pay him homage. A spontaneous popular crusade started in Normandy in 1320 aiming to liberate the Iberian Peninsula from the Moors. Instead the angry populace marched to the south attacking castles, royal officials, priests, lepers, and Jews.

In 1307 Philip married Joan II, Countess of Burgundy, with whom he had four daughters. The couple produced no male heirs, however, so when Philip died from dysentery in 1322, he was succeeded by his younger brother Charles IV.

== Personality and marriage ==
Arms of Philip as Count of Poitiers

Philip was born in Lyon in 1291, the second son of King Philip IV of France and Queen Joan I of Navarre. His father granted to him the county of Poitiers in appanage. Modern historians have described Philip V as a man of "considerable intelligence and sensitivity", and the "wisest and politically most apt" of Philip IV's three sons. Philip was influenced by the troubles and unrest that his father had encountered during 1314, as well as by the difficulties his older brother, Louis X, known as "the Quarreler", had faced during the intervening few years. At the heart of the problems for both Philip IV and Louis X were taxes and the difficulty in raising them outside of crises.

Philip married Joan of Burgundy, the eldest daughter of Otto IV, Count of Burgundy and Mahaut, Countess of Artois, on 21 January 1307. The original plan had been for Louis X to marry Joan, but this was altered after Louis was engaged to Margaret of Burgundy. Modern scholars have found little evidence as to whether the marriage was a happy one, but the pair had a considerable number of children in a short space of time, and Philip was exceptionally generous to Joan by the standards of the day. Philip went to great lengths not only to endow Joan with lands and money but to try to ensure that these gifts were irrevocable in the event of his early death. Amongst the various gifts were a palace, villages, additional money for jewels, and her servants and the property of all the Jews in Burgundy, which he gave to Joan in 1318.

Joan was implicated in Margaret's adultery case during 1314; Margaret was accused and convicted of adultery with two knights, upon the testimony of their sister-in-law, Isabella. Joan was suspected of having secretly known about the adultery; placed under house arrest at Dourdan as punishment, it was then implied that Joan was guilty of adultery herself. With Philip's support she continued to protest her innocence, and by 1315 her name had been cleared by the Paris Parlement, partially through Philip's influence, and she was allowed to return to court. It is unclear why Philip stood by her in the way that he did. One theory has been that he was concerned that if he were to abandon Joan, he might also lose Burgundy; another theory suggests that his slightly "formulaic" love letters to his wife should be taken at face value, and that he was in fact very deeply in love.

== Accession and the Salic Law ==
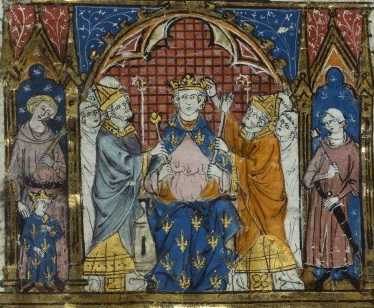
Philip engineered a hasty coronation after the death of his nephew, the young John I, to build support for his bid for the French throne in 1316–17.

Philip's older brother, Louis X, died on 5 June 1316 leaving the pregnant Clementia of Hungary as his widow. There were several potential candidates for the role of regent, including Charles of Valois and Duke Odo IV of Burgundy, but Philip successfully outmanoeuvred them, being appointed regent himself. Philip remained as regent for the remainder of the pregnancy and for a few days after the birth of his nephew John I, who lived for only five days.

What followed the death of John I was unprecedented in the history of the Capetian kings of France. For the first time, the king of France died without a son. The heir to the throne was now a subject of some dispute. Joan, the remaining daughter of Louis X by Margaret of Burgundy, was one obvious candidate, but suspicion still hung over her as a result of the scandal in 1314, including concerns over her actual parentage.

With only his niece between himself and the throne, Philip engaged in some rapid political negotiations and convinced Charles of Valois, who along with Odo IV was championing Joan's rights, to switch sides and support him instead. In exchange for marrying Philip's daughter, Odo IV abandoned his niece's cause, not only her claim to the French throne but also her claim to Navarre's. On 9 January 1317, with Charles's support, Philip was hastily crowned at Reims. The majority of the nobility, however, refused to attend. There were demonstrations in Champagne, Artois, and Burgundy, and Philip called a rapid assembly of the nobility on 2 February in Paris. Philip laid down the principle that Joan, as a woman, could not inherit the throne of France, played heavily upon the fact that he was now the anointed king, and consolidated what some authors have described as his effective "usurpation" of power. The exclusion of women, and later of their male descendants, was later popularized as the Salic law by the Valois monarchy. Joan, however, did accede in 1328 to the throne of Navarre, which did not hold to the Salic law.

The next year, Philip continued to strengthen his position. He married his eldest daughter Joan to the powerful Odo IV, bringing the Duke over to his own party. Philip then built his reign around the notion of reform – "reclaiming rights, revenues and territories" that had been wrongly lost to the crown in recent years.

== Domestic reform ==
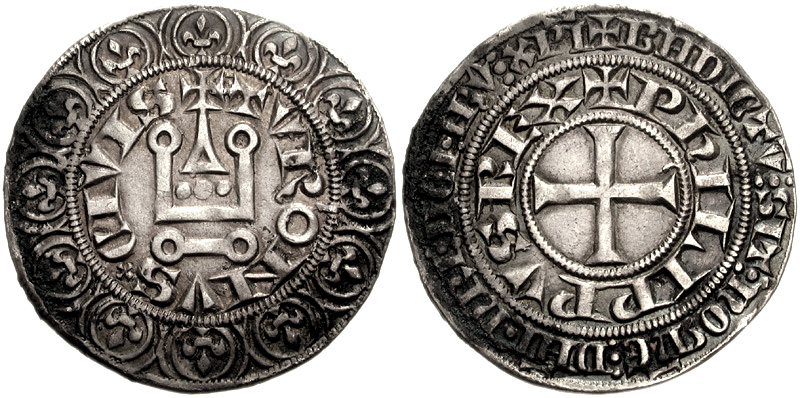
Philip took steps to reform the French currency during the course of his reign, including these silver Tournois coins.

Domestically, Philip proved a "strong and popular" king, despite inheriting an uncertain situation and an ongoing sequence of poor harvests. He followed in the steps of his father, Philip IV, in trying to place the French crown on a solid fiscal footing and revoked many of the unpopular decisions of his predecessor and older brother, Louis X. He also instituted government reforms, reformed the currency and worked to standardise weights and measures. Amongst Philip's key appointments was the later cardinal Pierre Bertrand, who would play a key role in successive French royal governments in subsequent years.

In 1317, Philip reissued an act first passed by his father, in 1311, condemning the alienation and theft of royal resources and offices in the provinces. By 1318, his political situation strengthened, Philip went further, setting out in a new act a distinction between the French royal domain – the core set of lands and titles that belonged permanently to the crown – and those lands and titles that had been forfeited to the crown for one reason or another. If the French crown was to bestow or grant new lands to nobles, Philip declared, they would usually be given only from the second source: this was a double-edged announcement, at once reinforcing the core, unalienable powers of the crown, whilst also reassuring nobles that their lands were sacrosanct unless they were forfeited to the crown in punishment for a crime or misdemeanour. Philip was responsible for the creation of the cours des comptes in 1320, a court responsible for auditing the royal accounts to ensure proper payment; the courts still exist today. In practice, Philip did not entirely keep to his self-declared principles on grants of royal lands and titles, but he was far more conservative in such matters than his immediate predecessors.

== Resolution of the Flanders conflict and England ==
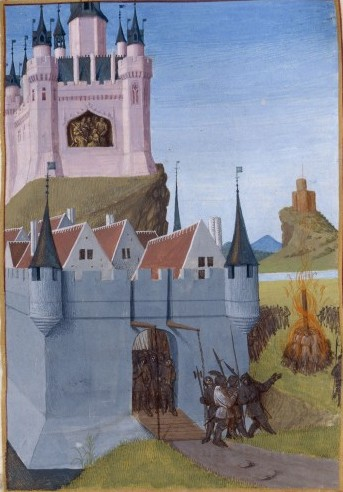
Philip pursued a successful diplomatic and dynastic solution to the long running tensions with Flanders.

Philip was able to achieve a successful resolution of the ongoing Flanders problem. The Count of Flanders ruled an "immensely wealthy state", which largely led an autonomous existence on the edge of the French state. The French king was generally regarded as having suzerainty over Flanders, but in recent years the relationship had become strained. The French army had been defeated at Courtrai in 1302 attempting to reassert French control, and despite the later French victory at the Battle of Mons-en-Pévèle the relationship remained tense.

Robert III of Flanders had continued to resist France militarily, but by Philip's accession to the throne had found himself increasingly isolated politically in Flanders itself. Meanwhile, the French position had become strained by the need to maintain a wartime footing. Louis X had prohibited exports of grain and other material to Flanders in 1315, resulting in a profitable smuggling industry that in turn discouraged legal trade with the French crown along the border region; Louis was forced to directly requisition food for his forces, resulting in a string of complaints from local lords and the Church. Philip began to reinstate a proper recompensation scheme in 1317, but the situation remained unstable.

Both Philip and Robert turned away from seeking a military solution in favour of a political compromise. Accordingly, Robert made an accommodation with Philip in June 1320, under which Robert would confirm his young grandson, Louis, as his designated heir, in return for Louis being pledged in marriage to Philip's second daughter, Margaret. This would provide Robert, and then Louis, with strong French support within Flanders. Louis was, to a great extent, already under Philip's influence. Louis had been brought up in Nevers in central France, and at Philip's court. and was culturally effectively a French prince. This arrangement was a considerable success for Philip's policy, although over time Louis' clear French loyalties and lack of political links within Flanders itself would lead to political upheaval and peasant revolt.

Philip also faced difficulties with Edward II of England. Like the Count of Flanders, Edward in his role as the ruler of Gascony owed homage to the king of France, but as a king in his own right, and as the head of a largely autonomous Gascon province, was disinclined to do so. Edward had not given homage to Louis X, and initially declined to do so to Philip, who had a reputation as being more favourable to the English than Louis X. In 1319 Philip allowed Edward to give homage by proxy, an honour by the standards of the day, but expected him to do so in person in 1320. Edward arrived in Amiens to do so, only to find that Philip was now insisting that Edward also give an oath of personal fealty to him – an act going beyond that of normal feudal homage. Edward gave homage but refused to swear fealty; nonetheless, this marked a period of increased French pressure on England over Gascony.

== Crusades ==
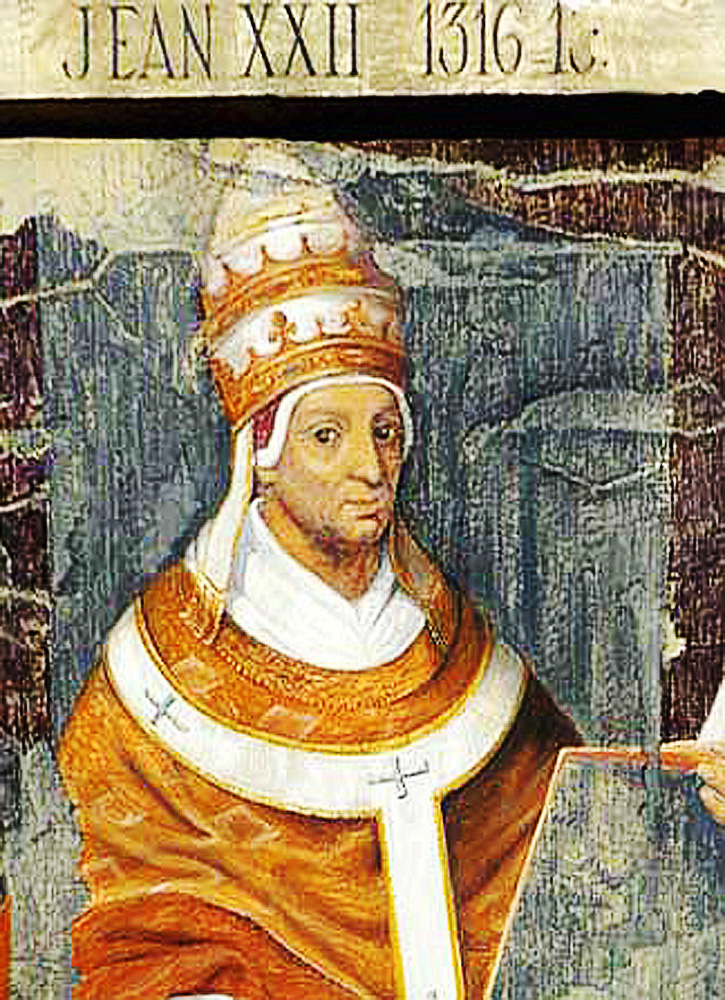
Pope John XXII, initially a close ally of Philip in the late crusading movement in Christian Europe, joined with him in condemning the violent Shepherds' Crusade in 1320.

Philip was also to play a role in the ongoing crusade movement during the period. Pope John XXII, the second of the Avignon popes, had been elected at a conclave assembled in Lyons during 1316 by Philip himself, and set out his renewed desire to see fresh crusades. Philip IV had agreed to a joint plan for a new French-led crusade at the Council of Vienne in 1312, with his son Philip, a "committed crusader," taking the cross himself in 1313. Once king himself, Philip was obligated to carry out these plans and asked John for and received additional funds after 1316. Both Philip and John agreed, however, that a French crusade was impossible whilst the military situation in Flanders remained unstable. Nonetheless, John continued to assure the Armenians that Philip would shortly lead a crusade to relieve them. An attempt to send a naval vanguard from the south of France under Louis I of Clermont failed, however, with the forces being destroyed in a battle off Genoa in 1319. Over the winter of 1319–20 Philip convened a number of meetings with French military leaders in preparation for a potential second expedition, that in turn informed Bishop William Durand's famous treatise on crusading. By the end of Philip's reign, however, he and John had fallen out over the issue of new monies and commitments to how they were spent, and the attentions of both were focused on managing the challenge of the Shepherds' Crusade.

The Shepherds' Crusade, or the Pastoreaux, emerged from Normandy in 1320. One argument for the timing of this event has been that the repeated calls for popular crusades by Philip and his predecessors, combined with the absence of any actual large scale expeditions, ultimately boiled over into this popular, but uncontrolled, crusade. Philip's intent for a new crusade had certainly become widely known by the spring of 1320, and the emerging peace in Flanders and the north of France had left a large number of displaced peasants and soldiers. The result was a large and violent anti-Semitic movement threatening local Jews, royal castles, the wealthier clergy, and Paris itself. The movement was ultimately condemned by Pope John, who doubted whether the movement had any real intent to carry out a crusade. Philip was forced to move against it, crushing the movement militarily and driving the remnants south across the Pyrenees into Aragon.

== Final year ==
=== "Leper scare" ===
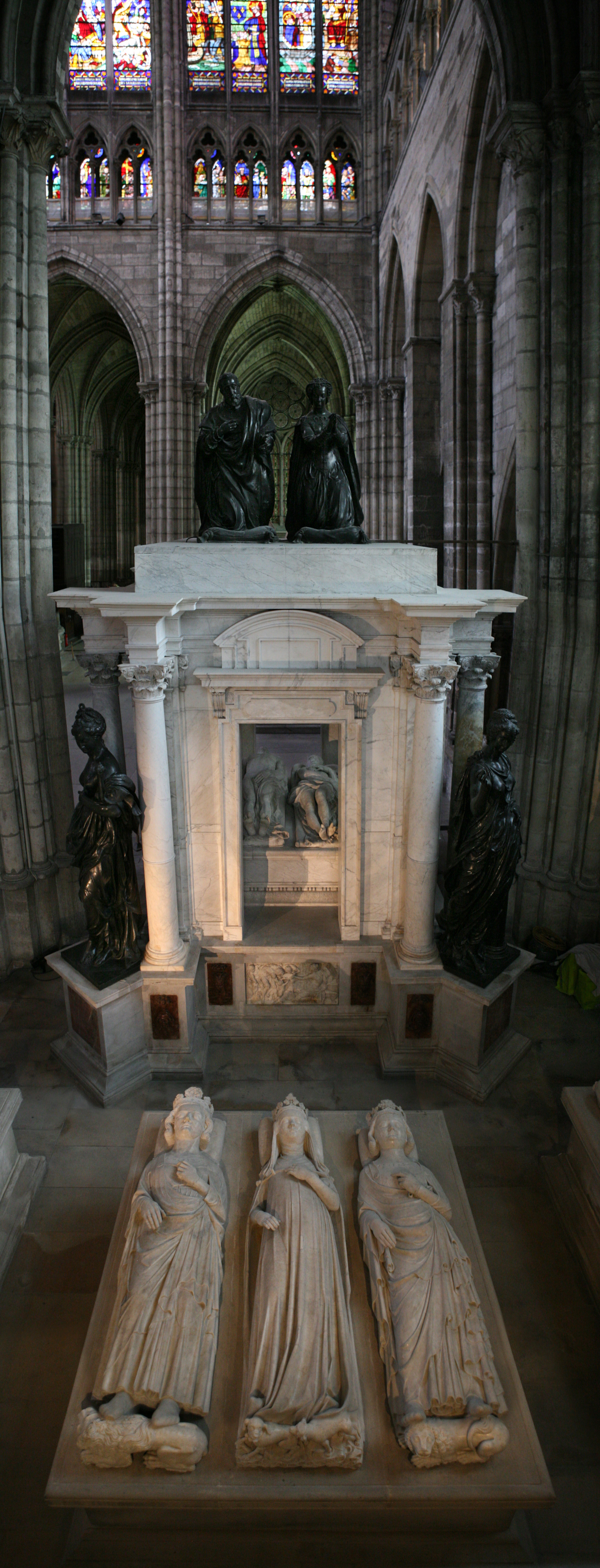
Effigies of Philip, his brother Charles and sister-in-law Joan

In 1321 an alleged conspiracy – the "leper scare" – was discovered in France. The accusation, apparently unfounded, was that lepers had been poisoning the wells of various towns, and that this activity had been orchestrated by the Jewish minority, secretly commissioned by foreign Muslims. The scare took hold in the febrile atmosphere left by the Shepherds' crusade of the previous year and the legacy of the poor harvests of the previous decade.

The French Jews were, by 1321, closely connected to the French crown; Philip had given orders that royal officials assist Jewish money lenders in recovering Christian debts, and some local officials were arguing that the crown was due to inherit the estates of dead Jewish merchants. Following the events of 1320, Philip was involved in fining those who had attacked Jews during the Shepherds' Crusade, which in practice added further to the dislike of this minority in France. Rumours and allegations about lepers themselves had been circulated in 1320 as well, and some had been arrested during the Crusade.

Philip was in Poitiers in June, involved in a tour of the south aimed at reform of the southern fiscal system, when word arrived of the scare. Philip issued an early edict demanding that any leper found guilty was to be burnt and their goods would be forfeit to the crown. The King's southern tour and reform plans, although administratively sound by modern standards, had created much local opposition, and modern historians have linked the King's role in Poitiers with the sudden outbreak of violence. This all put Philip in a difficult position: He could not openly side with those claiming wrongdoing by the lepers, Jews, and Muslims without encouraging further unnecessary violence; on the other hand, if he did not ally himself to the cause, he encouraged further unsanctioned violence, weakening his royal position. Some Jews did leave France as a result of the leper scare, but Philip had successfully resisted signing any formal edict, which limited the impact to some degree.

=== Death and succession ===
In August, Philip was continuing to progress his reform plans when he fell unwell from multiple illnesses. After a brief respite, he died at Longchamp, Paris. He was interred in Saint Denis Basilica, with his viscera buried at the church of the now-demolished Couvent des Jacobins in Paris.

By the principle of male succession that Philip had invoked in 1316, Philip was succeeded by his younger brother, Charles IV, since he left no sons. Charles was also to die without male issue, resulting ultimately in the claim to the French throne by Edward III of England and the subsequent Hundred Years War (1337–1453).

== Family ==
In January 1307 Philip V married Joan II, Countess of Burgundy (daughter and heiress of Otto IV, count of Burgundy), and they had five children:

1. Joan (1/2 May 1308 – 10/15 August 1349), Countess of Burgundy and Artois in her own right and wife of Odo IV, Duke of Burgundy
2. Margaret (1309 – 9 May 1382), wife of Louis I of Flanders. Countess of Burgundy and Artois in her own right.
3. Isabelle (1310 – April 1348), wife of Guigues VIII de La Tour du Pin, Dauphin de Viennois.
4. Blanche (1313 – 26 April 1358), a nun.
5. Philip (24 June 1316 – 24 February 1317).

== In fiction ==
Philip is a character in Les Rois maudits (The Accursed Kings), a series of French historical novels by Maurice Druon. In the novel, Philip was depicted as the most shrewd among the three sons of Philip IV. He was portrayed by Josep Maria Flotats in the 1972 French miniseries adaptation of the series, and by Éric Ruf in the 2005 adaptation.

== Bibliography ==
- Anselme de Sainte-Marie, Père (1726). Histoire généalogique et chronologique de la maison royale de France [Genealogical and chronological history of the royal house of France] (in French). Vol. 1 (3rd ed.). Paris: La compagnie des libraires.
- Barber, Malcolm. (1981) "The Pastoureaux of 1320." Journal of Ecclesiastical History. 32 (1981): 143–166.
- Brown, Elizabeth A. R. (2000). "The King's Conundrum: Endowing Queens and Loyal Servants, Ensuring Salvation, and Protecting the Patrimony in Fourteenth-Century France". In Burrow, John Anthony; Wei, Ian P. (eds.). Medieval Futures: Attitudes to the Future in the Middle Ages. The Boydell Press.
- Cox, Eugene L. (1967). The Green Count of Savoy. Princeton, New Jersey: Princeton University Press.
- Drees, Clayton J. (2001). The Late Medieval Age of Crisis and Renewal, 1300–1500: a Biographical Dictionary. Greenwood Press.
- Duby, George. (1993) France in the Middle Ages 987–1460: from Hugh Capet to Joan of Arc. Oxford: Blackwell.
- Field, Sean L. (2019). Courting Sanctity: Holy Women and the Capetians. Cornell University Press.
- Fryde, Natalie. (2003) The Tyranny and Fall of Edward II 1321–1326. Cambridge: Cambridge University Press.
- Hallam, Elizabeth M (1980). Capetian France, 987–1328. Longman Group UK Limited.
- Henneman, John Bell (1971). Royal Taxation in Fourteenth-Century France: The Development of War Financing, 1322-1359. Princeton University Press.
- Holmes, George. (2000) Europe, Hierarchy and Revolt, 1320–1450, 2nd edition. Oxford: Blackwell.
- Housley, Norman (1986). The Avignon papacy and the Crusades, 1305–1378. Oxford: Clarendon Press.
- —— (1992). The later Crusades, 1274–1580: from Lyons to Alcazar. Oxford: Oxford University Press.
- Jordan, William Chester (1996). The Great Famine: Northern Europe in the early Fourteenth Century. Princeton: Princeton University Press.
- —— (2005). Unceasing Strife, Unending Fear: Jacques de Therines and the Freedom of the Church in the Age of the Last Capetians. Princeton: Princeton University Press.
- Keane, Marguerite (2016). Material Culture and Queenship in 14th-century France: The Testament of Blanche of Navarre. Brill.
- Nirenberg, David. (1996) Communities of Violence: Persecution of Minorities in the Middle Ages. Princeton: Princeton University Press.
- Riley-Smith, Jonathan. (2005) The Crusades: a History. London: Continuum.
- TeBrake, William Henry (1994). A Plague of Insurrection: Popular Politics and Peasant Revolt in Flanders, 1323–1328. University of Pennsylvania Press.
- Wagner, John. A. (2006) Encyclopedia of the Hundred Years War. Westport: Greenwood Press.
- Warner, Kathryn (2016). Isabella of France, The Rebel Queen. Amberley.
- Wood, Charles T. (1966). The French Apanages and the Capetian Monarchy, 1224-1328. Harvard University Press.
- Woodacre, Elena (2013). The Queens Regnant of Navarre: Succession, Politics, and Partnership, 1274-1512. Palgrave Macmillan.

Philip V of France House of Capet Born: c. 1293 Died: 3 January 1322
Regnal titles
Vacant Title last held by John I	King of France and Navarre; 1316 – 1322	Succeeded by Charles IV and I
Vacant Title last held by Alphonse	Count of Poitou; 1311 – 1316	Vacant Title next held by John II (as John I)
Preceded by Joan II as sole ruler	Count Palatine of Burgundy; 1307 – 1322; With: Joan II	Succeeded by Joan II as sole ruler
