= Joan III of Burgundy =

Countess of Burgundy and Artois from 1330 to 1347

Joan III
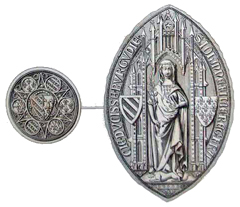

Countess of Burgundy and Artois
- Reign: 1330–1347
- Predecessor: Joan II
- Successor: Philip I
- Born: 1/2 May 1308
- Died: 10/15 August 1347 (aged 39)
- Spouse: Odo IV, Duke of Burgundy (m. 1318)
- Issue: Philip I, Count of Auvergne
- House: Capet
- Father: Philip V, King of France
- Mother: Joan II, Countess of Burgundy

Coat of arms of the Free County of Burgundy.

Joan III of Burgundy (1/2 May 1308 – 10/15 August 1347), also known as Joan of France, was a reigning Countess of Burgundy and Artois in 1330–1347. She was also Duchess of Burgundy by marriage to Odo IV, Duke of Burgundy.

== Biography ==
Joan was the eldest daughter of King Philip V of France and Countess Joan II of Burgundy. She was married in 1318 to Odo IV, Duke of Burgundy, as part of a settlement between the two men regarding the French succession (Odo had previously supported the right of his niece - and Joan's cousin - Queen Joan II of Navarre, to inherit the French throne as well); Joan thus became Duchess consort of Burgundy by marriage.

In 1330, Joan became reigning Countess of Burgundy and Artois in her own right, following the death of her mother.

Her son Philip predeceased her; her titles therefore passed to her grandson, Philip I of Burgundy upon her death in 1347.

== Issue ==
Joan and Odo had six sons, although only one survived his childhood:

- A stillborn son (1322)
- Philip (1323-1346)
- John (1325–1327 or 1328)
- Three sons who died young, born in 1327, 1330, and 1335

== Sources ==
- Jackson, Guida M. (1999). Women Rulers Throughout the Ages: An Illustrated Guide. ABC-CLIO.
- Le Bel, Jean (2011). The True Chronicles of Jean Le Bel, 1290-1360. Translated by Bryant, Nigel. Boydell & Brewer.
- Henneman, John Bell (1971). Royal Taxation in Fourteenth-Century France: The Development of War Financing, 1322-1359. Princeton University Press.

Regnal titles
Preceded by Joan II	Countess of Burgundy and Artois; 1330–1347	Succeeded by Philip I
