= Knightfall (TV series) =

American TV series

- Genre: Historical drama
- Created by: Don Handfield; Richard Rayner
- Starring: Tom Cullen; Jim Carter; Pádraic Delaney; Simon Merrells; Julian Ovenden; Olivia Ross; Ed Stoppard; Sabrina Bartlett; Bobby Schofield; Sarah-Sofie Boussnina; Tom Forbes; Mark Hamill
- Composers: Andrew Price (s. 1); Natalie Holt (s. 2)
- Countries of origin: United States; Czech Republic
- Original language: English
- No. of seasons: 2
- No. of episodes: 18

Production
- Executive producers: Dominic Minghella; Josh Appelbaum; André Nemec; Jeff Pinkner; Scott Rosenberg; Barry Jossen; Jana Bennett; Douglas Mackinnon; Jeremy Renner; Don Handfield; Richard Rayner; Sonny Postiglione; Aaron Helbing; Rick Jacobson; Ethan Reiff; Cyrus Voris
- Producers: Michael Wray; Gideon Amir; Nina Heyns
- Production locations: Prague, Czech Republic; Dubrovnik, Croatia
- Cinematography: Christopher Manley; Thomas Yatsko; Boris Mojsovski
- Editors: Nathan D. Gunn; Stephen Mark; John Coniglio; Patrick McMahon; Peter Mergus; Joe Sawyer; Garret Donnelly; Sang Han; Debby Germino; Heather Goodwin Floyd
- Running time: 40–45 minutes
- Production companies: A+E Studios; Midnight Radio; Island Pictures; Motor; The Combine; Stillking Films; PAKT Media

Original release
- Network: History
- Release: December 6, 2017 – May 13, 2019

Knightfall is a historical drama television series created by Don Handfield and Richard Rayner for the History Channel. Filmed in the Czech Republic and Croatia, it premiered on December 6, 2017, in the United States. On August 13, 2018, History renewed the series for a second season, which premiered on March 25, 2019. In May 2020, it was announced that the series had been cancelled.

Knightfall recounts the success, fall, persecution, and suppression of the Knights Templar, as orchestrated by King Philip IV of France on October 13, 1307. The series focuses on the fictional Templar leader Landry du Lauzon, a brave warrior discouraged by the Templars' failures in the Holy Land, who is reinvigorated by news that the Holy Grail has resurfaced.

== Cast and characters ==
=== Main ===
- Tom Cullen as Landry de Lauzon, a senior brother of the Knights Templar and a veteran of the Crusades, who is a noble, courageous, and headstrong knight who began his service with the Templars as Godfrey's squire – Godfrey tutored and trained him into a skilled and respected warrior monk. After the Siege of Acre, Landry witnesses the failure of the Crusade, the conquest of the Holy Land by the Saracens and the loss of the most-prized relic in all of Christendom: the Holy Grail. 15 years later, Landry has his faith shaken and frustrated by the Order's inactivity, becomes Master and Commander of the Paris Temple after Godfrey's assassination, the subsequent investigation revealing the Grail is now in France. His hope is reignited, and Landry leads his fellow Templars on a journey to uncover the reasons behind his mentor's death and location of the Grail. Harry Webster portrays a young Landry in season 1.
- Jim Carter as Pope Boniface VIII, a warm and avuncular man and a seasoned religious leader, who acts as a stabilizing, incorruptible force within a corrupt medieval world. The Templar Knights value him as their Holy leader, and they're willing to execute his orders without question. Boniface personally appoints Landry the new Master and Commander of the Paris Temple after Godfrey's assassination and entrusts him the mission of finding the Holy Grail, hoping to use it to launch a new Crusade and reclaim the Holy Land. Simon Haines portrays the younger Father Benedetto in season 2. (main season 1, featured season 2)
- Pádraic Delaney as Gawain, the greatest swordsman of the Templar Order who was crippled by a leg injury sustained in the Siege of Acre while protecting Landry. 15 years later, after Godfrey's assassination, he is told by the new Master Landry he can no longer fight. Unable to serve in the field, Landry assigns him as the training master to the Order's initiates, teaching future knights, including the commoner Parsifal. Feeling his heroism is no longer celebrated, he struggles to maintain his loyalty to the Order, just as he struggles to come to terms with his physical limitations. Gawain feels that, of all the Templars, he has the most to gain from the recovery of the Holy Grail, due to its reported ability to heal.
- Simon Merrells as Tancrède de Hauteville, a veteran Templar fiercely loyal to the order. Unlike most Templars, Tancrede was once married, but he gave up married life in order to join the Templars. As the steadfast, brave, and resolute knight who venerates his Templar vows above all else, Tancrede imagines himself as the heir apparent to Godfrey, the Master and Commander of the Paris Temple, although he concedes to Landry following Godfrey's assassination. With the revelation that the Holy Grail is now in France, Tancrede aids and advises Landry on his quest, and comes to understand what his role must be.
- Julian Ovenden as William de Nogaret, King Philip's scheming counsellor, pragmatic lawyer and right-hand man. De Nogaret is unashamedly godless, and a calculating manipulator ahead of his time. He is driven to destroy the power of organized religion, in revenge for his parents being burned at the stake as heretics for practising Catharism. Cool and supremely calculating, De Nogaret is more involved in the quest for the Holy Grail than he appears. He also secretly desires Philip's daughter, Isabella, while seeking to make her the next Queen of England. Freddie Preston portrays a young de Nogaret in season 2.
- Olivia Ross as Queen Joan (season 1), a formidable diplomat and strategist. Joan is a devoted mother who seeks to ensure her children, especially her daughter, marry for love rather than duty like she was to Philip, whom she has grown to fear. She and Philip are friends of Landry after he saved them from being murdered by brigands – against Landry's vows of celibacy, and without Philip's knowledge, the two pursued a secret romance and Joan is secretly pregnant with his child.
- Ed Stoppard as King Philip, known for his good looks (hence the nickname "The Fair"), Philip struggles both as a King and a husband. He seeks to control his family while dealing with the politics and power moves that are an inevitable part of running his kingdom. Philip longs to be a great monarch and to transform France into the greatest power in Europe. He and Joan are friends of Landry after he saved them from being murdered by brigands, and Philip considers him a teacher, confidant and friend (although he is unaware of their secret romance).
- Sabrina Bartlett (main season 1) and Genevieve Gaunt (recurring season 2) as Princess Isabella, Queen Joan and King Philip's daughter. Isabella is a beautiful, energetic and self-aware young woman whose youth belies a capacity to go to extraordinary lengths to get what she wants. Now of legal age, her impending marriage promises a strong political alliance for France.
- Bobby Schofield as Parsifal (season 1), a young peasant farmer who is decent and honest, although is also brash and recklessly brave, aiming to do what he feels is right, even faced with great peril. He was happily engaged to a young woman, Marie, but is left consumed with grief and a desire for vengeance when she is murdered by Godfrey's assassins. Adrift and wanting to pursue her killers, he accepts an offer from Landry to join the Templars.
- Sarah-Sofie Boussnina as Adelina (season 1), a Jewish homeless thief who previously lived in Acre, but was rescued as a child by Landry and the Templars. Now living in France with her father, she is secretly involved with the unknown forces surrounding the Holy Grail.
- Tom Forbes as Prince Louis of France (season 2), King Philip and Queen Joan's eldest son and heir.
- Mark Hamill as Master Talus (season 2), a veteran Templar who trains the initiates at the Chartres Temple.

=== Recurring ===
- Nasser Memarzia as Draper, a Templar brother who serves as a doctor
- Marco Zingaro as Doctor Vigevano, the French court's doctor
- Jim High as Ulric, a Templar brother
- Robert Pugh (season 1) and Matthew Marsh (season 2) as Jacques De Molay, the 23rd and last Grand Master of the Knights Templar
- Peter O'Meara as Berenger, a Templar brother and the Master of the Chartres Temple

==== Season 1 ====
- Sam Hazeldine as Marcel De Caux/Godfrey, a Templar brother and the Master of the Paris Temple. Godfrey is a mentor and father figure to Landry.
- Cengiz Dervis as Roland, a brigand
- Adam Levy as Simon, a Jew and Adelina's father (as well as a survivor of Acre)
- Akin Gazi as Rashid, the leader of the Brotherhood of Light
- Joey Batey as Pierre, a Templar initiate (Episode 4, He Who Discovers His Own Self, Discovers God)
- Raymond Waring as Daniel
- Ben Bradshaw as Chamberlain Marigny
- Roy McCrerey as Charles, the Royal Steward
- Marcos Franz as Prince Lluis of Catalonia
- Enrique Arce as Rodrigo of Catalonia, the Catalan Ambassador
- Edward Bourne as Nicholas, De Nogaret's assistant
- Oliver Maltman as Robert, Earl of Oxford, the English Ambassador
- Amelia Clarkson as Sophie, Queen Joan's handmaiden
- Claudia Bassols as Queen Elena of Catalonia
- Jack Sandle as Malraux
- Lourdes Faberes as Altani
- Gina McKee as Landry's mother
- Thomas Coombes as Anthony, a Templar
- Ben Lamb as Dominic, a Templar
- Tony Pritchard as Ballard

==== Season 2 ====
- David Bowles as Gerard, a Templar brother
- Daniel Campbell as Kelton, a Templar initiate who is later admitted as a brother
- Brian Caspe as Angus, a Templar brother
- Michael James as Quentin, a Templar initiate who is later admitted as a brother
- Joseph Ollman as Vasant, a Templar initiate who is later admitted as a brother
- Dean Ridge as Rhone, a Templar initiate who is later admitted as a brother
- Jirí Weingärtner as Othon, a Templar brother
- Stephen Fewell as Archbishop Raymond DeGoth and, later, Pope Clement V
- Claire Cooper as Sister Anne
- Clementine Nicholson as Queen Margaret, the wife of Prince Louis.
- Salóme Gunnarsdóttir as Lydia, a victim of Louis' plot
- Louise Bond as Grecia
- Grace Carter as Camille

=== Notable guests ===
- James Coombes as Governor De Rouvray of Navarre (season 1)
- Simon Haines as Father Benedetto, the young Pope Boniface VIII (season 2)
- Pavel Bezdek as Pascale (season 2)
- Bill Ratner as Raynald (season 2)
- Sam Hoare as Gabriel (season 2), a Lazarist knight
- Ben Starr as Philippe (season 2)

== Episodes ==
Season	Episodes	Originally released	
Season	Episodes	First released	Last released
1	10	December 6, 2017	February 7, 2018
2	8	March 25, 2019	May 13, 2019

=== Season 1 (2017–18) ===
No. overall	No. in season	Title	Directed by	Written by	Original release date	U.S. viewers (millions)
1	1	"You'd Know What to Do"	Douglas Mackinnon	Don Handfield & Richard Rayner	December 6, 2017	1.77
While in the Holy Land in the midst of a 43-day siege during the Battle of Acre of 1291, Templar knight Brother Landry is thrown into a fight with the Sultan of the Mamluks, along with protecting the Holy Grail. Fifteen years later, while stationed in Paris, Landry, now a battle-worn warrior of the Holy Wars, fears that the Order has lost its purpose. However, when the blood of Master Godfrey is shed, it forces Landry and his brothers to take up arms again and try to get the Grail back.
2	2	"Find Us the Grail"	Douglas Mackinnon	Don Handfield & Richard Rayner	December 13, 2017	1.32
Pope Boniface arrives in Paris to learn of the grail's whereabouts and make Landry Master of the Temple. However, the pope's unexpected arrival threatens de Nogaret's carefully laid plans to marry King Philip and Queen Joan's daughter, Princess Isabella to Prince Edward of England. Later, Landry and Parsifal seek vengeance on Roland, the highwaymen's leader, who killed Godfrey and Marie, Parsifal's fiancée, after the farmer came to the Templar master's aid.
3	3	"The Black Wolf and the White Wolf"	David Petrarca	Dominic Minghella	December 20, 2017	1.48
After finding a clue of a coat of arms, Landry and Tancrede investigate the Holy Grail's whereabouts. Their journey leads them to Godfrey's childhood home where they discover his origin as Marcel, the youngest son of Baron de Caux. The story told by his older brother Raymond is cut short from an attack by Saracen assassins. Parsifal starts training to become a Templar, but he must first learn to be a monk. Meanwhile, de Nogaret plots against Isabella's union with Prince Lluís.
4	4	"He Who Discovers His Own Self, Discovers God"	David Petrarca	David Elliot & Jason Grote	December 27, 2017	1.08
When a Saracen prisoner is killed in cold blood inside the temple, Gwaine conducts an inquiry into the man's murder. In order to learn about the victim's symbol, Landry seeks out Jonas of the Ardennes, a pagan who helps him remember his childhood meeting with Malraux, a Cathar from the Brotherhood of Light. Isabella is betrayed by de Nogaret and her purity is tested days before her wedding to Lluís. Joan is with Landry's child and has to cover it up with Philip.
5	5	"Hard Blows Will Banish the Sin"	Metin Hüseyin	Sharon Hoffman & Vivian Tse	January 3, 2018	1.19
Fearing an attack by the English after the Earl of Oxford goes missing from his chambers, King Philip asks the Knights Templar to watch over Princess Isabella's wedding at the Palace. While personally protecting Queen Joan, Landry learns she is with his child. Gwaine and Parsifal investigate the Earl's personal effects and find Greek Fire, a deadly substance used by a Mongol mercenary alchemist Tencrede knew. But it seems de Nogaret is behind a massive cover-up.
6	6	"The Pilgrimage of Chains"	Metin Hüseyin	Sonny Postiglione	January 10, 2018	1.17
After enduring torture from the Saracens of the Brotherhood of Light, Landry returns to the temple in chains and shackles. The Saracens have agreed to give up the instructions of the scroll left by Godfrey for Landry, leading him to The Grail, under the condition of him giving up one of his Templar brothers, Tancrede. In the Royal Palace, soon after he is knighted, de Nogaret's plan is revealed by Isabella and he faces the death penalty for treason, but he is rescued by an ally.
7	7	"And Certainly Not the Cripple"	Douglas Mackinnon	Jason Grote & David Elliot	January 17, 2018	1.11
On a clue from the Brotherhood of Light, Landry, along with Gwaine, go to where he first met Godfrey; an orphanage. They meet a mysterious woman who leads them to The Grail. Queen Joan learns of an attack on her birth home, Navarre by her cousin, Queen Elena. After hearing about Joan's pregnancy, de Nogaret, now a commoner in hiding, deduces who the father is and plans to inform King Philip. Parsifal gets his vengeance on Roland and discovers who he really works for.
8	8	"IV"	Douglas Mackinnon	Vincent Angell	January 24, 2018	1.21
Landry brings The Grail back to the Temple of the Knights Templar and gives it to Pope Boniface who wants another crusade in order to rule Europe. However, his estranged mother and the Saracen, Rashid root out the traitor, Pierre, who leads the pope's army into a siege against his former brothers. De Nogaret risks everything by telling King Philip about the queen's romance and the pope's plans. Queen Joan decides to unite Catalonia and Navarre by taking out Queen Elena herself.
9	9	"Fiat!"	Douglas Mackinnon	Vivian Tse & Sharon Hoffman	January 31, 2018	1.05
With Tancrede back on his side, Landry seeks help from his brothers and the Knights Templar Grand Master, Jacques de Molay to take up arms against Pope Boniface. However, Molay already invited the pope to his commandry, along with Gwaine as a witness, and holds a trial there which finds Landry guilty of five of the Nine Great Crimes and is to be excommunicated. Back from Navarre, Queen Joan plots her escape from King Philip who has plans on what to do with her instead.
10	10	"Do You See the Blue?"	Douglas Mackinnon	Dominic Minghella & Sonny Postiglione	February 7, 2018	1.02
De Nogaret's assassin delivers the Holy Grail to him who gifts it to King Philip. Pope Boniface becomes aware of the news and instructs Landry to lead his Knights Templar back to Paris to recover it. However, King Philip, being advised by de Nogaret, sends mercenaries to intercept and kill them on their way back. They plan to do this in secrecy on the outside of the city, so that they might give the Templars a grand Christian funeral in Paris to further mask their involvement. Queen Joan learns of this plan and takes the Holy Grail to Landry and the Templars. In the forest, as mercenaries, commanded by Gawain and surrounded by Landry, Joan begs for his life angering Philip, who stabs her with his sword. Landry asks Joan to drink from the Holy Grail, but rather than saving her, it saves their baby girl who was born via a cæsarean delivery after Joan's death. Joan is laid to rest with the Templars who perished in the battle with the king's mercenaries. Later, Berenger, another Templar Master finds a vial containing a small scroll with names on it within the now-smashed Holy Grail, which he swallows.

=== Season 2 (2019) ===
No. overall	No. in season	Title	Directed by	Written by	Original release date	U.S. viewers (millions)
11	1	"God's Executioners"	Rick Jacobson	Aaron Helbing	March 25, 2019	0.93
Landry trusts Tancrede with his baby Eve, who assures him that she will be baptized kept safe. He then returns to the Chartres Temple, where the Grand Master expels him from the Order due to his sins. After Landry's persistent request to return, the brothers vote to admit him back into the Order, but as an initiate rather than as a brother. Landry begins his training, this time under Master Talus, who voted against Landry returning. Philip's son Louis returns to Paris and learns about the death of his mother Joan. Philip informs him on Joan's affair with Landry, and Louis promises revenge. Tancrede leads the initiates, including Landry, into the Paris Temple through a secret tunnel to retrieve the gold stored there. The Royal Guard attack them and some members are killed. Master Talus blames the deaths on Landry for not following his method of attack and Landry uses the discipline to punish himself for this mistake. Later, Louis returns Joan's corpse to Paris and Philip discovers that her baby was removed from her belly. De Nogaret asks the distressed Gawain, who lives in poverty, to help him in a scheme against the Knights Templar.
12	2	"The Devil Inside"	Samira Radsi	Ethan Reiff & Cyrus Voris	April 1, 2019	0.56
When de Nogaret was a child, his parents were burned at the stake by a young Boniface for heresy as they were Cathars. Louis and his mercenaries visit a Catholic church where they assassinate the priest and steal his baptismal records in order to murder all recently-baptized babies. The Knights Templar initiates are sent into the forest by Master Talus who tasks them with retrieving lumber. In the forest, the initiates see Luciferians who murder a girl on a stake as part of a Satanic ritual. The Luciferians then attack the Knights Templar initiates, killing one of them. When Landry and the rest of the initiates return to the Temple, Landry is blamed for the death and is forced to undergo an exorcism. As Knights Templar go to the forest to find the Luciferians, they are killed by Prince Louis and his mercenaries who then steal the mantles of the Knights Templar; among those murdered is Draper. Prince Louis and his mercenaries murder christened infants dressed in the garb of Templars. Boniface visits France in order to pay respects to Joan and while he is in his chamber, he is murdered by de Nogaret, with the help of Gawain.
13	3	"Faith"	Samira Radsi	Russell Rothberg	April 8, 2019	0.54
Louis enters a household and murders an innocent father and his child, who was mentioned in the Church of the Holy Nativity's baptismal records. His wife, Margaret of Burgundy arrives in Paris after hearing about the death of Joan. Louis later enters into a rage due to his impotence. Philip puts pressure upon Louis to bear an heir for the throne and warns Louis that his wife has the potential to be unfaithful. The Templars prepare to finish the Luciferians, who murdered some brothers. Landry, seeing the other initiates as unprepared, ventures out to the Luciferian camp to kill the devil worshippers alone. Although Landry is able to successfully kill many of them, they overwhelm him, but Master Talus arrives on his steed to kill the rest of the Luciferians, thus saving Landry. Landry ponders his existence, feeling that God has abandoned him, but then Master Talus shares his personal testimony of how he clung to his faith when the Saracens imprisoned him. Master Talus tells Landry that God has been with him, despite his sins, and that He is working in him. Master Talus and Landry, along with the other knights, pray in thanksgiving for their safety.
14	4	"Equal Before God"	David Wellington	Kristen SaBerre	April 15, 2019	0.71
Landry undergoes his investiture and is made a brother of the Knights Templar, along with the other initiates. A wounded knight from the Order of Saint Lazarus arrives at the Chartres Temple, informing the Knights Templar that Pope Boniface has been murdered and King Philip has sent Gawain to slaughter them. The Templars travel to the Church of Saint Lazarus, where they are greeted by the leper knights, and are invited to stay, dine and pray with them. The King's Army, led by Gawain, attack the Knights of Saint Lazarus and the Knights Templar at the Church of Saint Lazarus. Although outnumbered, Landry believes that God has provided the Lazarists and the Templars a method of defense—fire—which they use to slaughter a number of Gawain's men, causing Gawain to retreat. Meanwhile, at the palace, de Nogaret informs Philip that Louis followed his strategy to slaughter newly-baptized babies. The mother of one of the victims, Lydia, arrives at the palace to give witness, but realizes that it was Louis, not the Templars, who killed her son. She is silenced and trapped by Louis before she can tell the others present.
15	5	"Road to Chartres"	David Wellington	Aaron Helbing	April 22, 2019	0.53
King Philip is enraged by Gawain's news that the Templars and Lazarists have massacred his army, but Gawain manages to earn de Nogaret's trust by revealing to him alleged Templar secrets. As Landry and Tancrede are paying a visit to his daughter Eve at the convent, they are attacked by Prince Louis and his bodyguards, disguised as Templars, intending to kill Eve. Landry manages to buy some time for his daughter to escape safely, but Louis and his guards massacre the remaining nuns at the convent. When Landry and Tancrede reach the Templar Base to inform the Grandmaster that Prince Louis and King Philip are framing them, they find themselves facing King Philip's army. Louis returns to the palace and learns the truth from a former member of the King's Army that it was King Philip who murdered Queen Joan, just as Landry had told him during their second encounter.
16	6	"Blood Drenched Stone"	Roel Reine	Ethan Reiff & Cyrus Voris	April 29, 2019	0.71
Pope Clement V, under the influence of King Philip, de Nogaret and Gawain, declares the Templars to be heretics. Jacques de Molay and some of the Templars hold up in the Chartres Temple rather than surrender to King Philip's army, but they soon realize that they have been duped. Suspecting the trap, Landry, along with other Templars, refuses to march out of the Temple, which is attacked by King Philip's army. During the battle, King Philip's men attempt to use gunpowder to blow up the gate, but this is thwarted thanks to a Templar archer. When King Philip's army try to build a siege tower, Landry leads an expedition into the camp and successfully sabotages it, but unfortunately three Templars are left behind in the camp. Under threat of torture (which didn't work on de Molay) one of them discloses the location of the sally port into the Chartres Temple. King Philip and his army attack the Temple using the secret gate, and defeat the Templars. At the palace, Isabella asks two of her lovers to rape Margaret after drugging her in the Tour de Nesle affair. Isabella later betrays these men and has them killed.
17	7	"Death Awaits"	Roel Reine	Russell Rothberg & Kristen SaBerre	May 6, 2019	0.59
The French Army march the Templars into Paris in chains, where they are made to haul wood into the city for their execution and are mocked by the people, who believe the royal propaganda that they have been murdering babies. When Jacques de Molay proclaims the innocence of the Templars, de Nogaret produces the captured Templar from the battle for the Chartres Temple who confesses to the charges against the order, having been tortured to do so. As Landry and his remaining brothers are imprisoned, they witness Jacques de Molay being burned at the stake. Margaret, having learned that her husband Louis killed Lydia's husband and child, confronts him about the crime. After being framed by Isabella, Margaret is arrested and thrown into a prison tower. Gawain surprisingly turns up as a prisoner among the Templars, to whom he reveals that he found Landry's daughter and Sister Anne and helped them escape, and that he tried to kill King Philip while Tancrede was being tortured. Philip refuses to allow Louis to visit Margaret and declares his intention of having Louis's marriage annulled. The Templars, joined by Gawain, make their last prayer to God, reciting the Lord's Prayer, before de Nogaret lights the fires for their execution.
18	8	"While I Breathe, I Trust the Cross"	Rick Jacobson	Aaron Helbing	May 13, 2019	0.65
As Landry and his Templar brothers are about to be executed, Master Talus and the Lazarist knights under Gabriel, along with Anne, arrive in a covered wagon and free a small number of them. They escape to the Paris Temple where they find Lydia, who offers them shelter in her house as the royal forces break in. Master Talus single-handedly repels an attack from an entire company of the king's guards, giving time for Anne and the other Templars to escape. In the morning, the separated Templars climb to the rooftops to find one another, a Templar strategy. Philip, angry at de Nogaret for failing to capture Landry, beats him severely and sends Isabella to England. The Templars, along with Gawain and Lydia, use a secret passageway to reach the Palace where they undock a boat to leave Paris. Anne and Tancrede, however, are killed from crossbow fire by the king's men before they can reach the dock. Landry re-enters the palace alone to kill King Philip for attempting to murder his daughter. With the army focused on tracking the Templars, no guards are present to defend the king. Prince Louis, having seen his beloved wife Margaret die in prison as well as hearing of the death of his mother on his father's hands, abandons Philip to single combat with Landry, as does de Nogaret. After a brief but brutal sword fight, Landry tells Philip that God has forsaken him, and kills him.

== Production ==
=== Development ===
In January 2016, History announced it had picked up Knightfall for a 10-episode straight-to-series, executive produced by Jeremy Renner. The series was conceived by Renner's production partner Don Handfield and Los Angeles-based British writer and journalist Richard Rayner. British writer-producer Dominic Minghella served as showrunner for the first season. Knightfall recounts the fall, persecution, and burning at the stake of the Knights Templar, as orchestrated by King Philip IV of France on October 13, 1307. Minghella said that the Swedish film Arn – The Knight Templar was one of the main inspirations for the series.

A Czech-American co-production presented by History, the first season of Knightfall was developed and produced by A+E Studios. Dominic Minghella, Josh Appelbaum, Andre Nemec, Jeff Pinkner, Scott Rosenberg, Barry Jossen, Jana Bennett, Douglas Mackinnon, Jeremy Renner, Don Handfield, Richard Rayner, and Sonny Postiglione are credited as executive producers, while Philip G. Flores acted as co-executive producer. The season was produced by Michael Wray for the first four episodes and Gideon Amir for the last six episodes. Jason Grote, Alex Shevchenko, David Minkowski and Matthew Stillman acted as co-producers, while David Elliot served as supervising producer.

The production team for the first season includes casting director Debbie McWilliams, costume designer Diana Cilliers, composer Andrew Price, production designer Ondrej Nekvasil, editors Nathan D. Gunn for the first, sixth and tenth episodes, Stephen Mark for the second episode, John Coniglio for the third and seventh episodes, Patrick McMahon for the fourth and eighth episode, Peter Mergus for the fifth and ninth episode, and Joe Sawyer for the fifth and sixth episodes, and cinematographer Christopher Manley.

On August 13, 2018, it was announced that Knightfall was renewed for a second season. Aaron Helbing was hired as executive producer, writer and showrunner for the second season, replacing Dominic Minghella. Knightfall actor Simon Merrells confirmed that Spartacus: Gods of the Arena and Spartacus: War of the Damned director Rick Jacobson was also working on the series. The production hired a number of European directors for the second season, including Samira Radsi and Roel Reiné. The second season consists of eight episodes.

A Czech-American co-production presented by History, the second season of Knightfall was developed and produced by A+E Studios. Aaron Helbing, Josh Appelbaum, Andre Nemec, Jeff Pinkner, Scott Rosenberg, Barry Jossen, Rick Jacobson, Ethan Reiff, Cyrus Voris, Don Handfield, Richard Rayner and Jeremy Renner are credited as executive producers, while Russell Rothberg acted as co-executive producer. The season was produced by Michael Wray for the first three episodes and Nina Heyns for the last five episodes. David Minkowski, Matthew Stillman and Cristina Verano acted as co-producers.

The production team for the second season includes casting director Suzanne Smith, costume designer Diana Cilliers, composer Natalie Holt, production designer Ondrej Nekvasil, editors Garret Donnelly for the first and fifth episodes, Sang Han for the second and sixth episodes, Debby Germino for the third and seventh episodes and Heather Goodwin Floyd for the fourth and eighth episodes, and cinematographers Thomas Yatsko for the first, fourth, fifth and eighth episodes and Boris Mojsovski for the second, third, sixth and seventh episodes.

In May 2020, it was announced that the series had been canceled.

=== Casting ===
With the series' renewal, two new main cast members were announced. Mark Hamill was cast as Talus, an old Templar veteran of the Crusades who lived through a decade of captivity in the Middle East, and now tasked with training younger knights. One of his ex-students is Landry, once a master himself but forced to start over after breaking his vows in the first season. Tom Forbes was cast as Prince Louis, the violent and unpredictable son of King Philip.

Genevieve Gaunt was cast in the recurring role of Isabella, King Philip's daughter and on her way to becoming the woman who history would call the "she-wolf of France". Gaunt replaced Sabrina Bartlett, who portrayed the princess in season one. Additional recurring roles include Irish actor Peter O'Meara as Chartres Temple Master Berenger, Underworld: Blood Wars actress Clementine Nicholson as Princess Margaret, Prince Louis's wife, and Claire Cooper as Sister Anne.

=== Filming ===
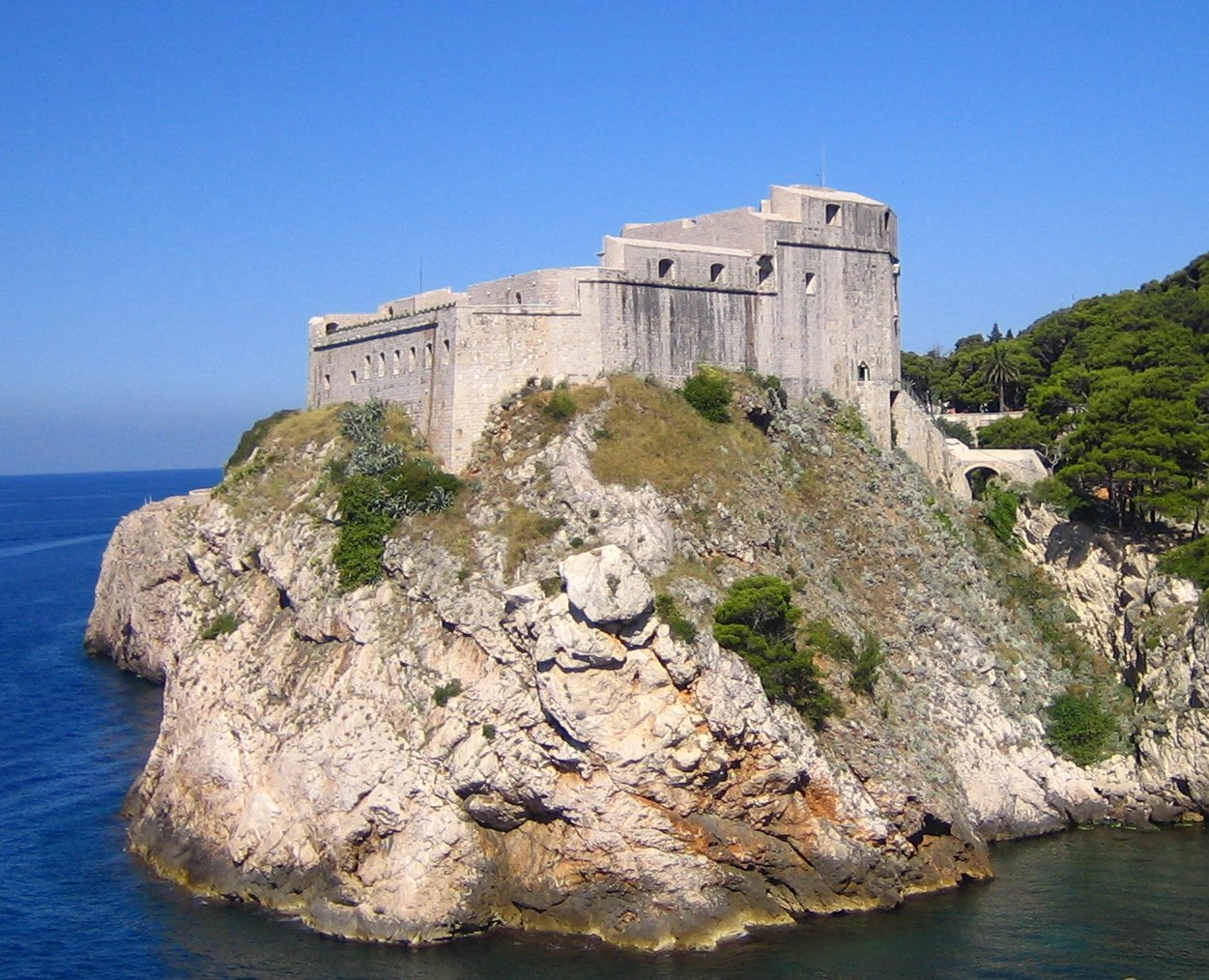
Fort Lovrijenac, one of the filming locations in Dubrovnik

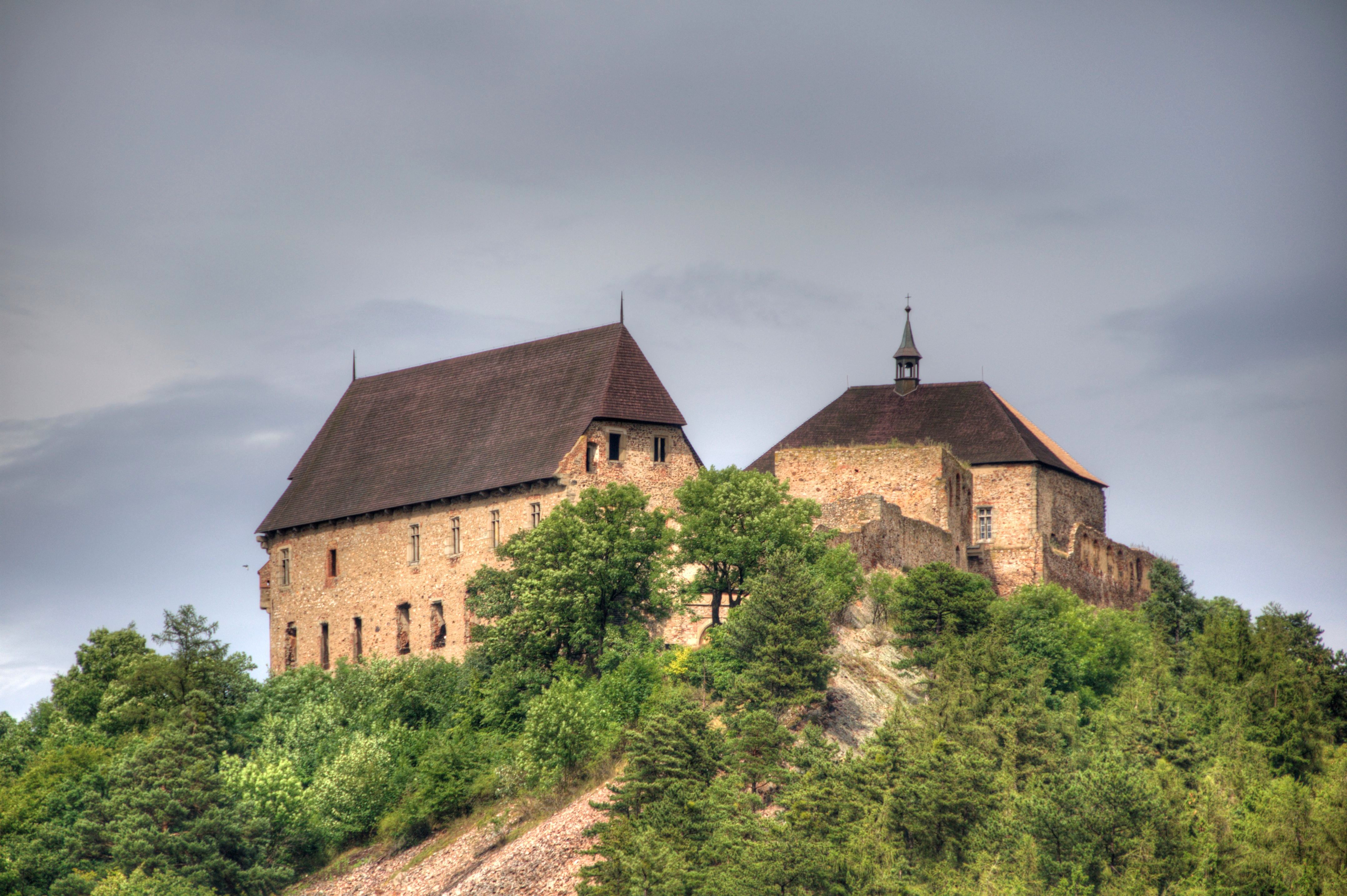
Točník Castle

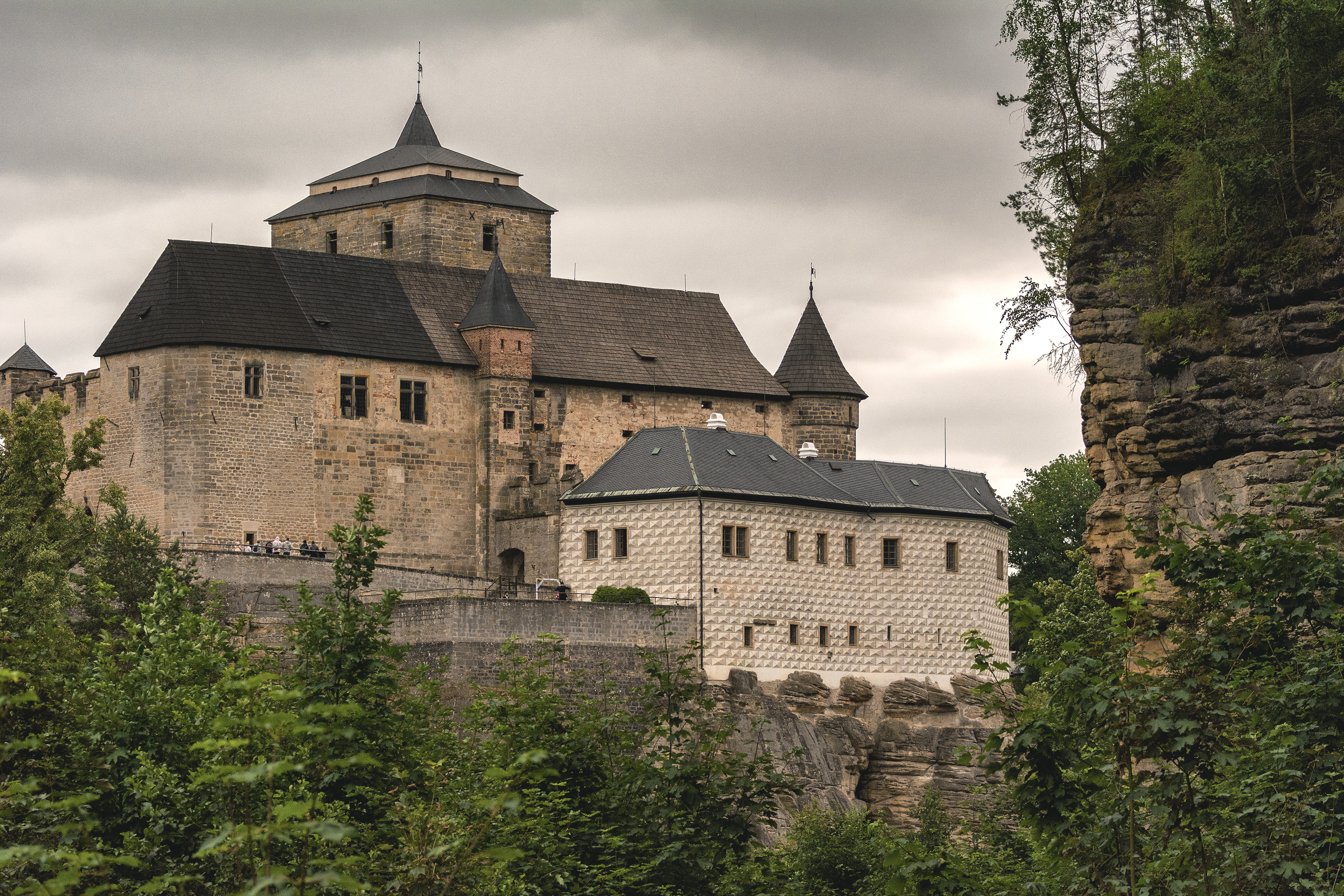
Kost Castle

Production started with three days of filming during the last week of June 2016 in Dubrovnik on Croatia's southern Adriatic coast, with Douglas Mackinnon (Outlander) as director. Set mainly around the Walls of Dubrovnik's Fort Lovrijenac (St. Lawrence Fortress) and the bay of Pile, these scenes depict The Siege of Acre. PAKT Media offered their services, and over 140 Croatian film workers were involved with the production.

Mackinnon served as the principal director, handling most episodes. Metin Hüseyin and David Petrarca (Game of Thrones) also directed a block each. Knightfall was shot primarily in Prague, Czech Republic, with its base at the Barrandov Studios. Several exteriors imitating medieval Paris were built in surrounding suburbs and villages, including Průhonice, and Doksany. Streets in Old Town and Švihov Castle were utilized. Filming started on July 8. According to Barrandov CEO Petr Tichý, the studio was chosen partially based on the quality of the 15th-century interior they had previously built for Borgia. According to Tom Cullen, the main cast had a two-and-a-half week "boot camp" with French stuntman and fight choreographer Cédric Proust. Cullen had taken fencing classes in the past, but had not swung a sword in eight years. The total cost for the season was CZK 1.1 billion.

On August 26, 2016, a fire broke out at the backlot of Barrandov Studios, destroying the exterior sets for Knightfall, with an estimated damage of 100 million CZK (US$4.5 million). Only a small part of the set, representing a medieval city, was saved. The following Monday, shooting resumed at another location in the city. The fire affected the production schedule, but the production was not to be moved to another city, and would focus on street locations. David Minkowski, a senior producer at Stillking Films, added, "In conjunction with our insurers and Barrandov construction, we are planning to rebuild the destroyed backlot set as soon as possible and complete filming in Czech Republic,. Filming for the first season wrapped in mid-December 2016.

The filming of the second season wrapped on December 19, 2018.

Other locations in the Czech Republic that were used for filming the series included the Doksany Monastery, Točník Castle, Kost Castle near Libošovice, Zvíkov Castle and the Medieval Open-Air Řepora museum.

== Release ==
A teaser trailer debuted on February 1, 2017, on History Channel, depicting a bloody Templar helmet. The series premiered on December 6, 2017. The second season premiered on March 25, 2019.

The series was pre-sold to SBS in Australia. HBO, its subsidiary Cinemax, and FilmBox Premium also obtained the rights in central and eastern Europe. History, which developed the original series, aired Knightfall in North America.

== Reception ==
=== Critical reception ===
On review aggregation website Rotten Tomatoes, season 1 had an approval rating of 55% based on 20 reviews. On Metacritic, the series has a weighted average score of 47 out of 100, based on reviews from 12 critics, indicating "mixed or average reviews".

For the second season, Rotten Tomatoes listed only four reviews, with three favorable; two of the reviews praised the addition of Mark Hamill with one commenting that "the barely recognizable Star Wars icon carries every scene in which he appears".

Inaccuracies in the series have been defended by the series' historical consultant, Dan Jones, as dramatic licence. He says the quest for the Holy Grail would have been recognised as myth by people in the Middle Ages, and is part of the legend which has since developed around the Templars.

=== Accolades ===
Knightfall was nominated for Best Fantasy Television Series at the 44th Saturn Awards.

== Other media ==
In May 2017, it was announced that A+E Networks had partnered with Titan Publishing to develop original novels and an eight-part comic book series based on the series. In 2019, a tie-in novel based on the series, The Infinite Deep, was released by author David B Coe.
