= Tatobity =

- Municipality
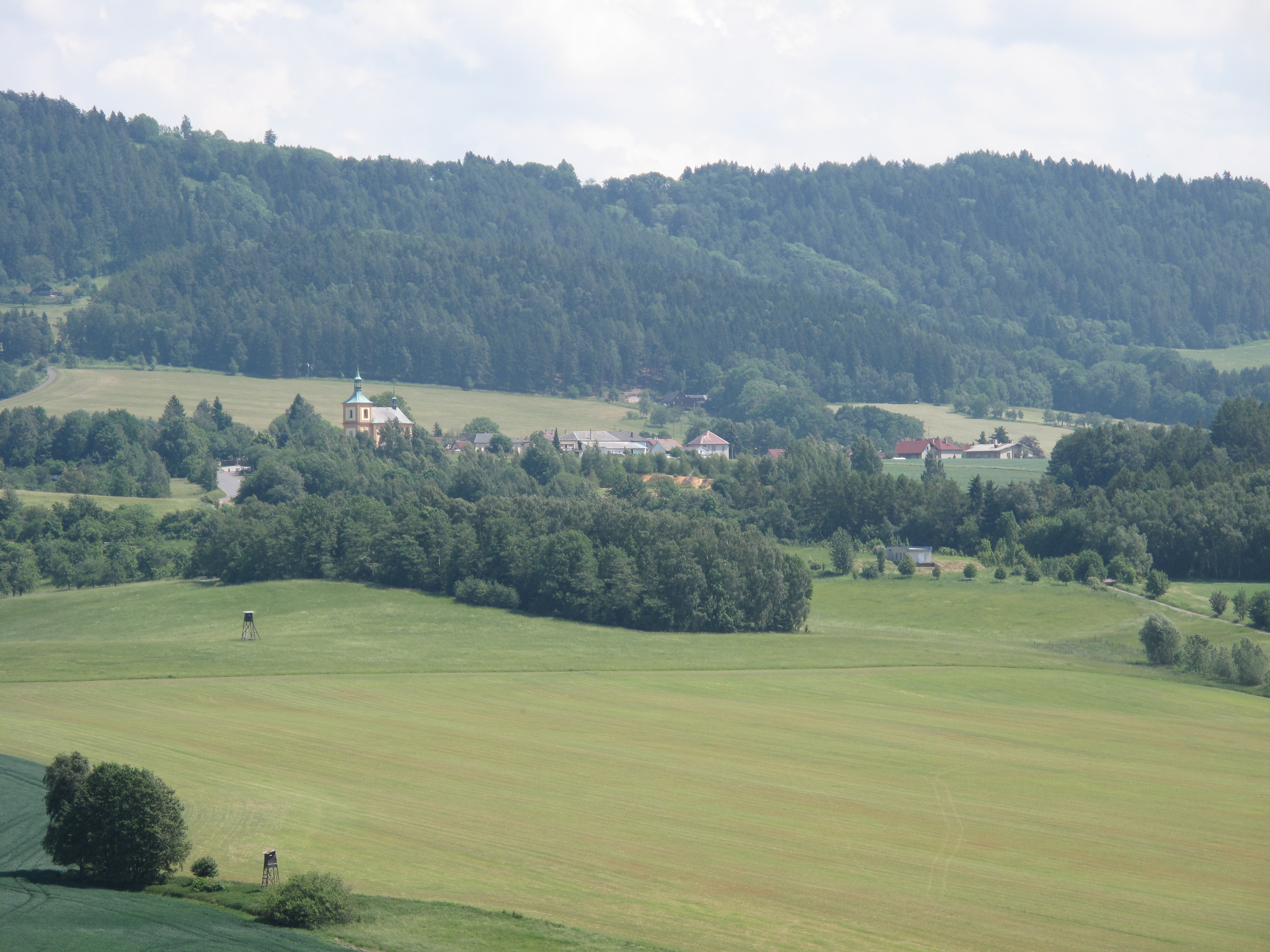
- View of Tatobity

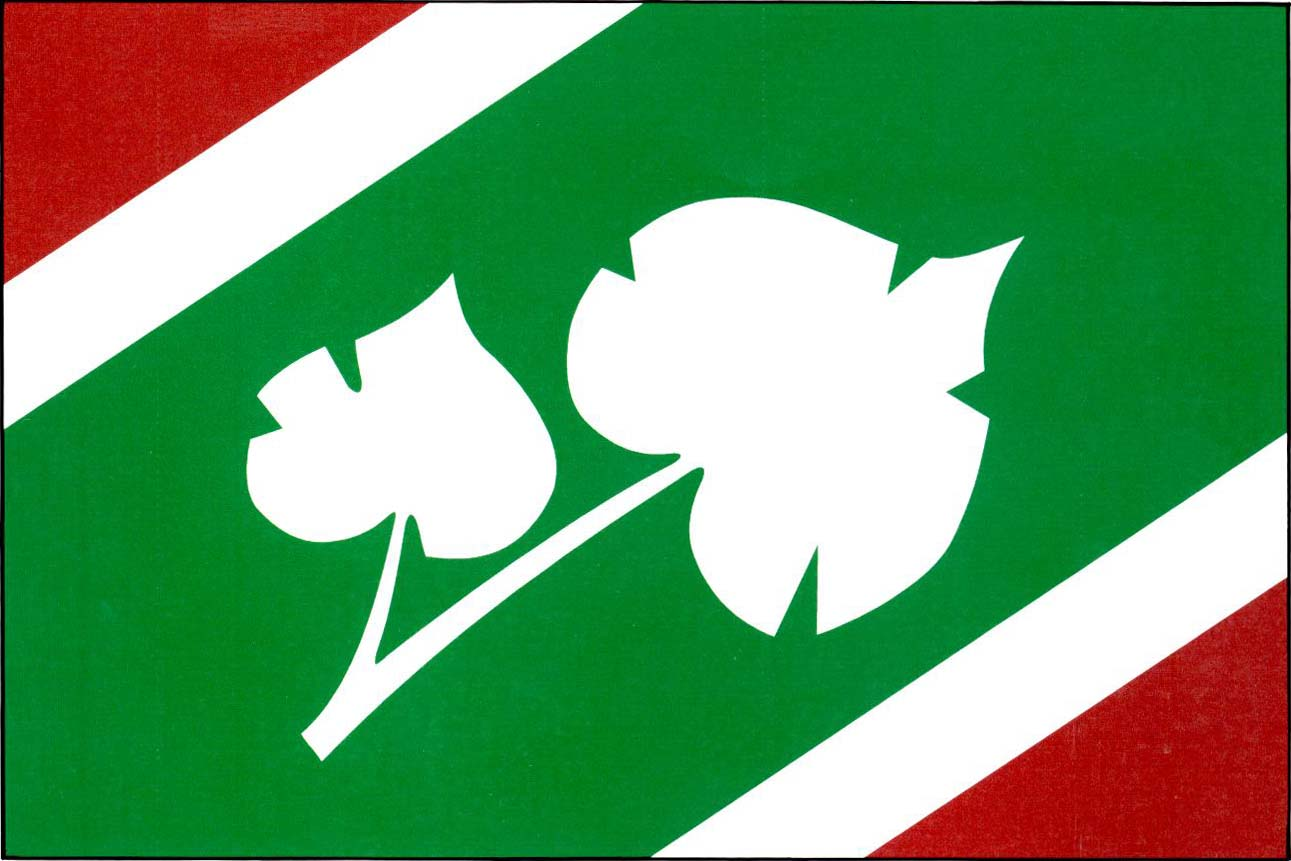
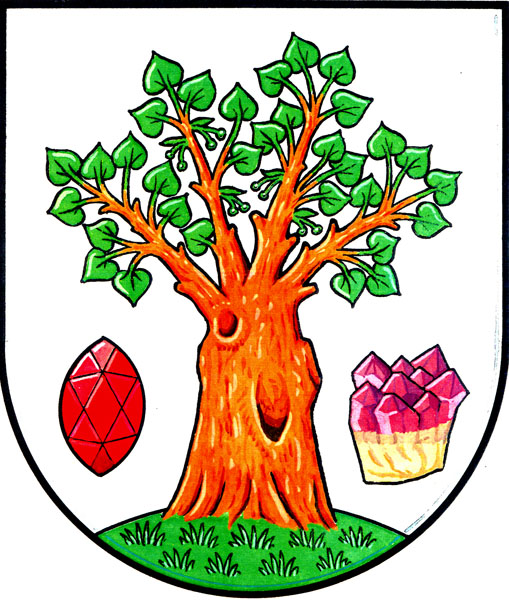
- Flag Coat of arms

- Location in the Czech Republic
- Coordinates: 50°34′17″N 15°16′24″E
- Country: Czech Republic
- Region: Liberec
- District: Semily
- First mentioned: 1514

Area
  - Total: 7.07 km^{2} (2.73 sq mi)
- Elevation: 398 m (1,306 ft)

Population (2026-01-01)
  - Total: 626
  - Density: 88.5/km^{2} (229/sq mi)
- Time zone: UTC+1 (CET)
  - Summer (DST): UTC+2 (CEST)
- Postal codes: 512 53, 512 63
- Website: www.tatobity.cz

Tatobity is a municipality and village in Semily District in the Liberec Region of the Czech Republic. It has about 600 inhabitants.

== Administrative division ==
Tatobity consists of two municipal parts (in brackets population according to the 2021 census):

- Tatobity (459)
- Žlábek (108)

== Etymology ==
The name Tatobity is derived from the Old Czech word tat ('thief') and the Czech word bíti ('beat up'), meaning "the village of people who beat up thieves".

== Geography ==
Tatobity is located about 5 kilometres (3 mi) southwest of Semily and 25 km (16 mi) southeast of Liberec. It lies in a hilly landscape of the Ještěd–Kozákov Ridge. The highest point is at 610 m (2,001 ft) above sea level.

== History ==
The first written mention of Tatobity is from 1514. Until the establishment of an independent municipality in 1848, it belonged to the Hrubá Skála estate.

== Demographics ==
Historical population

Year	Pop.	±%
1869	1,192	—
1880	1,279	+7.3%
1890	1,362	+6.5%
1900	1,368	+0.4%
1910	1,330	−2.8%

Year	Pop.	±%
1921	1,194	−10.2%
1930	1,138	−4.7%
1950	805	−29.3%
1961	770	−4.3%
1970	679	−11.8%

Year	Pop.	±%
1980	587	−13.5%
1991	522	−11.1%
2001	523	+0.2%
2011	539	+3.1%
2021	567	+5.2%

Source: Censuses

== Transport ==
There are no railways or major roads passing through the municipality.

== Sights ==
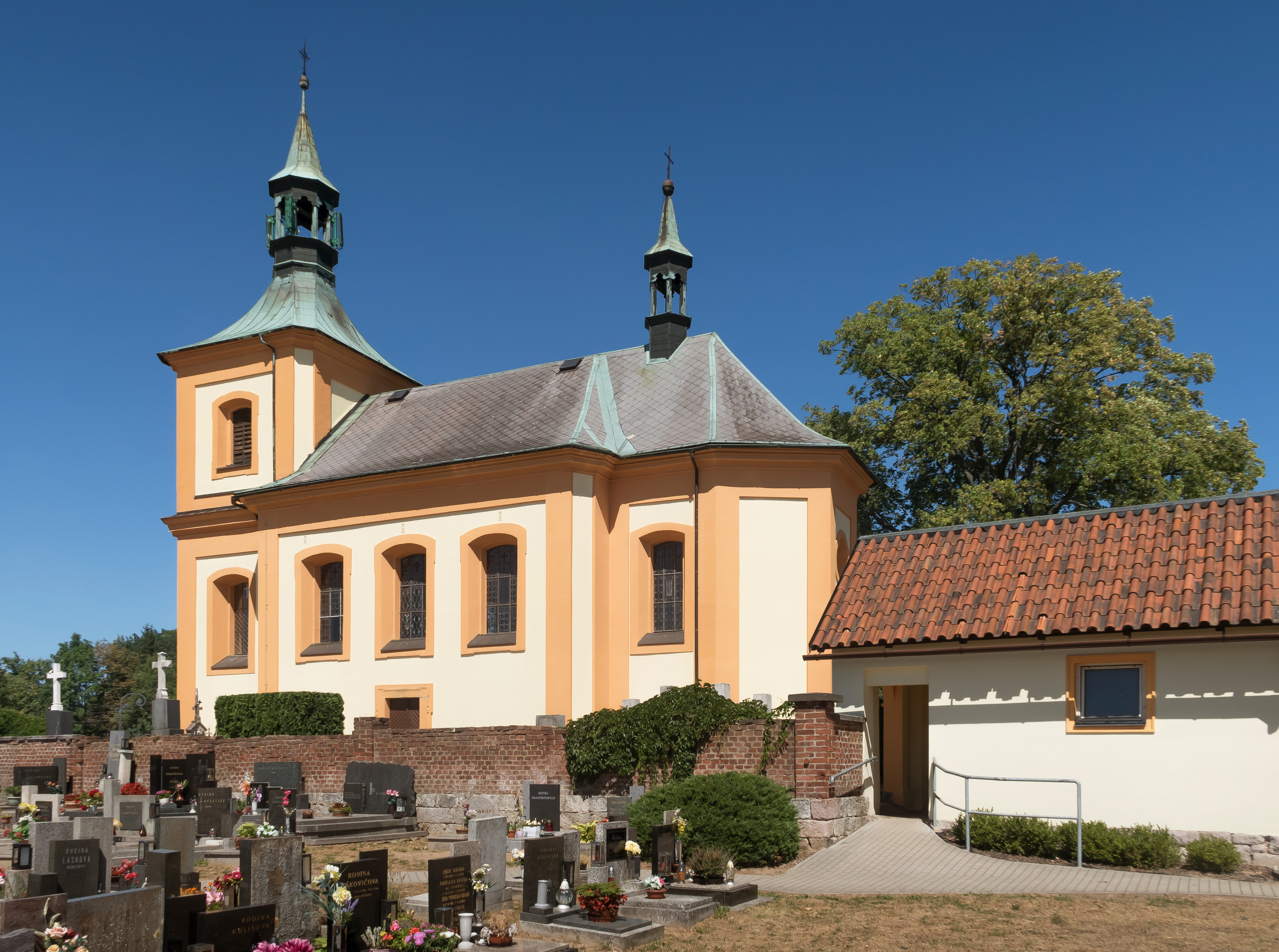
Church of Saint Lawrence

The main landmark of Tatobity is the Church of Saint Lawrence. It was built in 1714–1753.

Among the protected cultural monuments are a sandstone stone from 1776, a sandstone tombstone from 1847 and a statue of the Virgin Mary from 1867.

A notable sight is the Tatobity Millennial Linden. Its age is estimated at 600 to 1,000 years.
