= Tony Peers =

British actor and comedian (1946–2025)

- Born: John Anthony Peers; 7 December 1946; Wigan, Lancashire, England
- Died: 23 July 2025 (aged 78)
- Occupation(s): Actor, comedian

John Anthony Peers (7 December 1946 – 23 July 2025) was a British actor and comedian.

== Life and career ==
Peers was born on 7 December 1946 in Wigan, Greater Manchester. Tony began his career in the 1960s working at Butlins. Throughout his career, he worked in television, notably portraying Peter Mallett in Coronation Street in 1999 and as Bryan Dodds in Emmerdale. He also appeared in All Creatures Great and Small, Heartbeat, Where the Heart Is and L.A. Without a Map.

For the majority of his life, he was based in Scarborough.

Peers died on 23 July 2025, at the age of 78.
