= L.A. Without a Map =

1998 film by Mika Kaurismäki

- Canadian DVD cover
- Directed by: Mika Kaurismäki
- Screenplay by: Richard Rayner; Mika Kaurismäki
- Based on: Los Angeles Without a Map by Richard Rayner
- Produced by: Julie Baines; Sarah Daniel; Pierre Assouline
- Starring: David Tennant; Vinessa Shaw; Julie Delpy; Vincent Gallo; Cameron Bancroft; Joe Dallesandro
- Cinematography: Michel Amathieu
- Edited by: Ewa J. Lind
- Music by: Sébastien Cortella; Vincent Gallo
- Production companies: Euro American Films; Dan Films; Marianna Films; Arts Council England; Baltic Media; Yorkshire Media Production Agency; Finnish Film Foundation; British Screen; BSkyB; CLT-UFA International
- Distributed by: Senso Films (Finland); SND (France); United Media (United Kingdom)
- Release dates: 11 September 1998 (TIFF); 28 July 1999 (France); 27 August 1999 (Finland); 1 September 1999 (United Kingdom)
- Running time: 107 minutes
- Countries: France; United Kingdom; Finland; Luxembourg
- Languages: English; French

L.A. Without a Map (also known as Los Angeles Without a Map and I Love L.A.) is a 1998 romantic comedy-drama film directed by Mika Kaurismäki, who co-wrote the screenplay with Richard Rayner, based on Rayner's 1988 semi-autobiographical novel Los Angeles Without a Map. The film stars David Tennant, Vinessa Shaw, Julie Delpy and Vincent Gallo, with Cameron Bancroft and Joe Dallesandro. The plot follows a British undertaker and aspiring screenwriter who has a fling with an American aspiring actress and impulsively follows her to Los Angeles. It is an international co-production of France, the United Kingdom, Finland and Luxembourg.

== Plot ==
Richard, a 22-year-old Scottish undertaker and obituary writer, dreams of becoming a screenwriter and is dissatisfied with his mundane life in Bradford, Northern England. During a burial, he meets Barbara, a young aspiring Hollywood actress briefly visiting Bradford, and the two develop a connection. Barbara returns home and brags about the British writer she met while away. Infatuated with her, Richard impulsively flies to Los Angeles without informing his fiancée. When Richard arrives at the upscale Japanese restaurant where Barbara works as a waitress, she is surprised to see him.

Richard soon learns that Barbara has a boyfriend, womaniser director Patterson, though she insists that their relationship is strictly professional. With the help of Moss, a man he befriends, Richard rents a dingy apartment and takes a job as a pool cleaner while he waits to hear from Barbara. When Barbara finally calls, she and Richard go to the beach and she tells Richard that, although she likes him, it is safer for her future career if she stays with Patterson. In response, he tells her that he would have gone to the North Pole for her.

Richard takes Barbara to a nightclub, where Moss and his band (Leningrad Cowboys) are playing. Richard introduces Moss to Barbara's waitress friend Julie and the two quickly get along. Meanwhile, Barbara spots Patterson kissing the head waitress at the restaurant and leaves him. Richard, Barbara, Moss, and Julie spend the night on the road, before Moss and Julie leave to spend time together in a hotel in the morning. Barbara proposes to Richard and the pair have a Las Vegas wedding.

Barbara arranges a meeting for Richard with Takowsky, a noted screenwriting agent. Richard hands over his screenplay, Oozy Suicide, and returns home to work on more script ideas. Richard becomes jealous when Barbara auditions for Patterson's next film, though she does not get the part. After Richard learns that Patterson offered Barbara the role in exchange for sex, their relationship becomes strained. When Patterson reconsiders Barbara for the role, he invites her over to his house, much to Richard's chagrin. Annoyed by Richard's growing jealousy, Barbara leaves him.

Richard visits Barbara's restaurant, where Julie tells him that Barbara does not wish to see him anymore. He overhears that Barbara will attend a party later and is advised by the restaurant's owner that if he cannot win Barbara back, then he should kill her. Instead, Richard acquires chloroform to render her unconscious in case he cannot convince her to return to his side. Accompanied by Moss, Richard arrives at the party and finds Barbara. When Barbara angrily rebuffs Richard, he attempts to chloroform her, but she hits him in the face, knocking him to the ground.

Richard spends the night in prison and is released with the help of Takowsky. He returns to Bradford, where his undertaking business has been kept afloat by a colleague. During a burial, Barbara suddenly appears and brings back the Oozy Suicide screenplay, telling him that Takowsky has agreed to take Richard on as a client and presenting him with his first paycheck. Barbara admits that Richard was right about Patterson, and they rekindle their relationship, starting afresh in Bradford.

== Cast ==
- David Tennant as Richard
- Vinessa Shaw as Barbara
- Julie Delpy as Julie
- Vincent Gallo as Moss
- Cameron Bancroft as Patterson
- Joe Dallesandro as Michael
- Anouk Aimée as herself
- Saskia Reeves as Joy
- Steve Huison as Billy
- Lisa Edelstein as Sandra
- Matthew Faber as Joel
- Jean-Pierre Kalfon as Jean-Mimi
- Leningrad Cowboys as themselves
- James LeGros as Takowsky
- Tony Peers as vicar
- Malcolm Tierney as Joy's father
- Monte Hellman as himself
- Kevin West as Spielberg man
- Dijon Talton as kid
- Amanda Plummer as red pool owner
- Dominic Gould and Andre Royo as music store clerks
- Jerzy Skolimowski as Las Vegas minister
- Robert Davi as himself
- Johnny Depp as himself / William Blake (uncredited)
- Mika Kaurismäki as Michael Bambihill (uncredited)

== Production ==
Locations in the film include Chapel Street in Little Germany, Bradford; Undercliffe Cemetery, Forster Square and the Midland Hotel in Bradford; The Queen's Hotel pub at 195 Lumb Lane, Bradford; The Rex Cinema in Elland, West Yorkshire; Dean Clough in Halifax, West Yorkshire; the Yamashiro Historic District, EIDC and Guitar Center in Los Angeles, Malibu SpeedZone in City of Industry, California, Hollywood Park Casino in Inglewood, California, the Mayan Theater in Los Angeles and The Argyle Hotel on Sunset Strip in West Hollywood, California.
