= Libošovice =

- Municipality
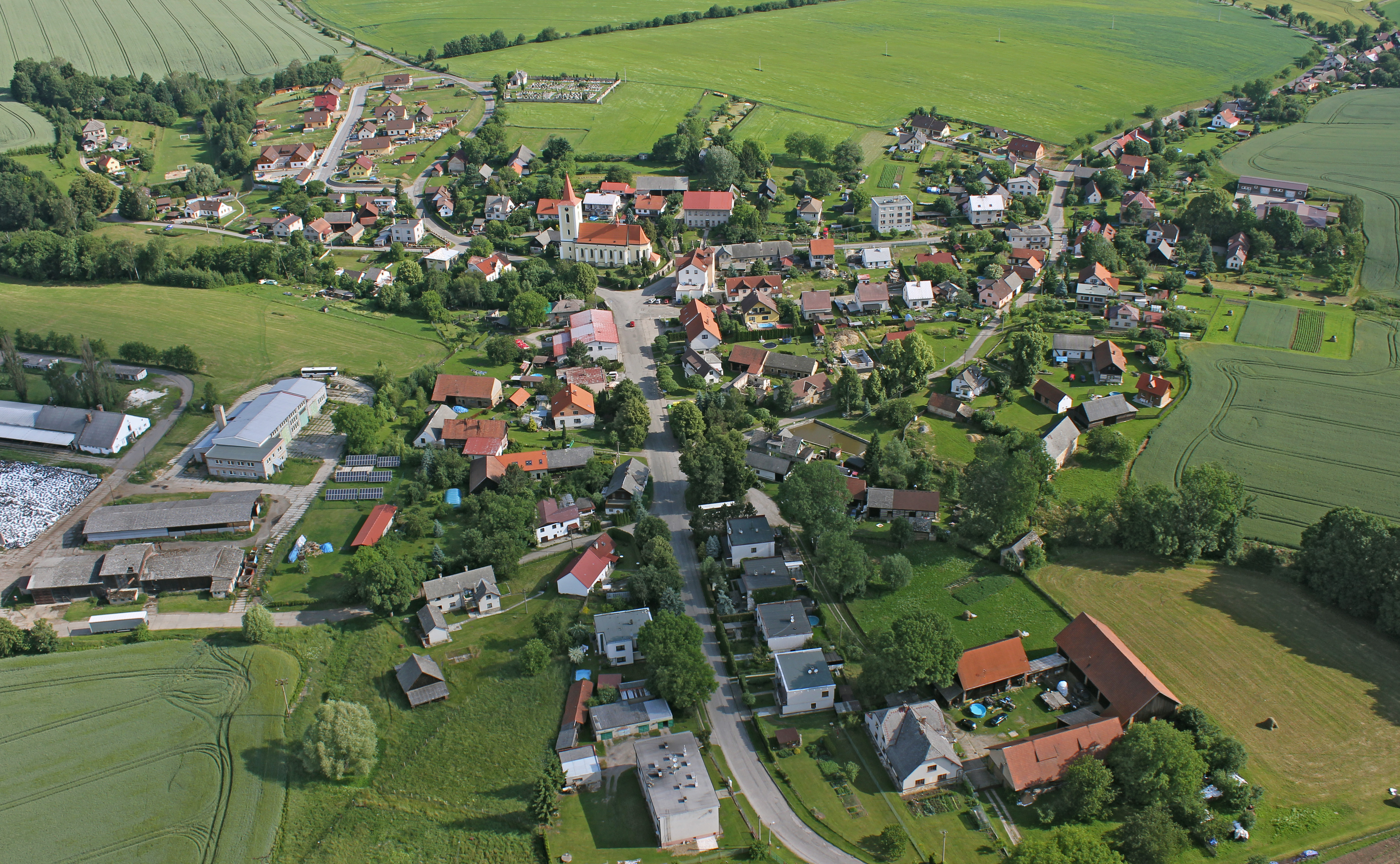
- Aerial view

- Location in the Czech Republic
- Coordinates: 50°29′26″N 15°9′46″E
- Country: Czech Republic
- Region: Hradec Králové
- District: Jičín
- First mentioned: 1353

Area
  - Total: 19.83 km^{2} (7.66 sq mi)
- Elevation: 295 m (968 ft)

Population (2026-01-01)
  - Total: 522
  - Density: 26.3/km^{2} (68.2/sq mi)
- Time zone: UTC+1 (CET)
  - Summer (DST): UTC+2 (CEST)
- Postal codes: 506 01, 507 44
- Website: libosovice.craj.cz

Libošovice is a municipality and village in Jičín District in the Hradec Králové Region of the Czech Republic. It has about 500 inhabitants. The municipality is known for the medieval Kost Castle, protected as a national cultural monument.

== Administrative division ==
Libošovice consists of nine municipal parts (in brackets population according to the 2021 census):

- Libošovice (307)
- Dobšice (36)
- Malá Lhota (12)
- Malechovice (25)
- Meziluží (23)
- Nepřívěc (36)
- Podkost (47)
- Rytířova Lhota (44)
- Vesec u Sobotky (31)

== Etymology ==
The name Libošovice is derived from the personal name Liboš, meaning "the village of Liboš's people".

== Geography ==
Libošovice is located about 14 kilometres (9 mi) northwest of Jičín and 30 km (19 mi) south of Liberec. It lies in the Jičín Uplands. The highest point is the hill Hůra at 388 m (1,273 ft) above sea level. The Klenice River originates here, flows through the Libošovice village and then supplies the fishpond Bílý rybník within the municipality. The Žehrovka Stream flows along the northern municipal border. The entire municipal territory lies in the Bohemian Paradise Protected Landscape Area.

== History ==
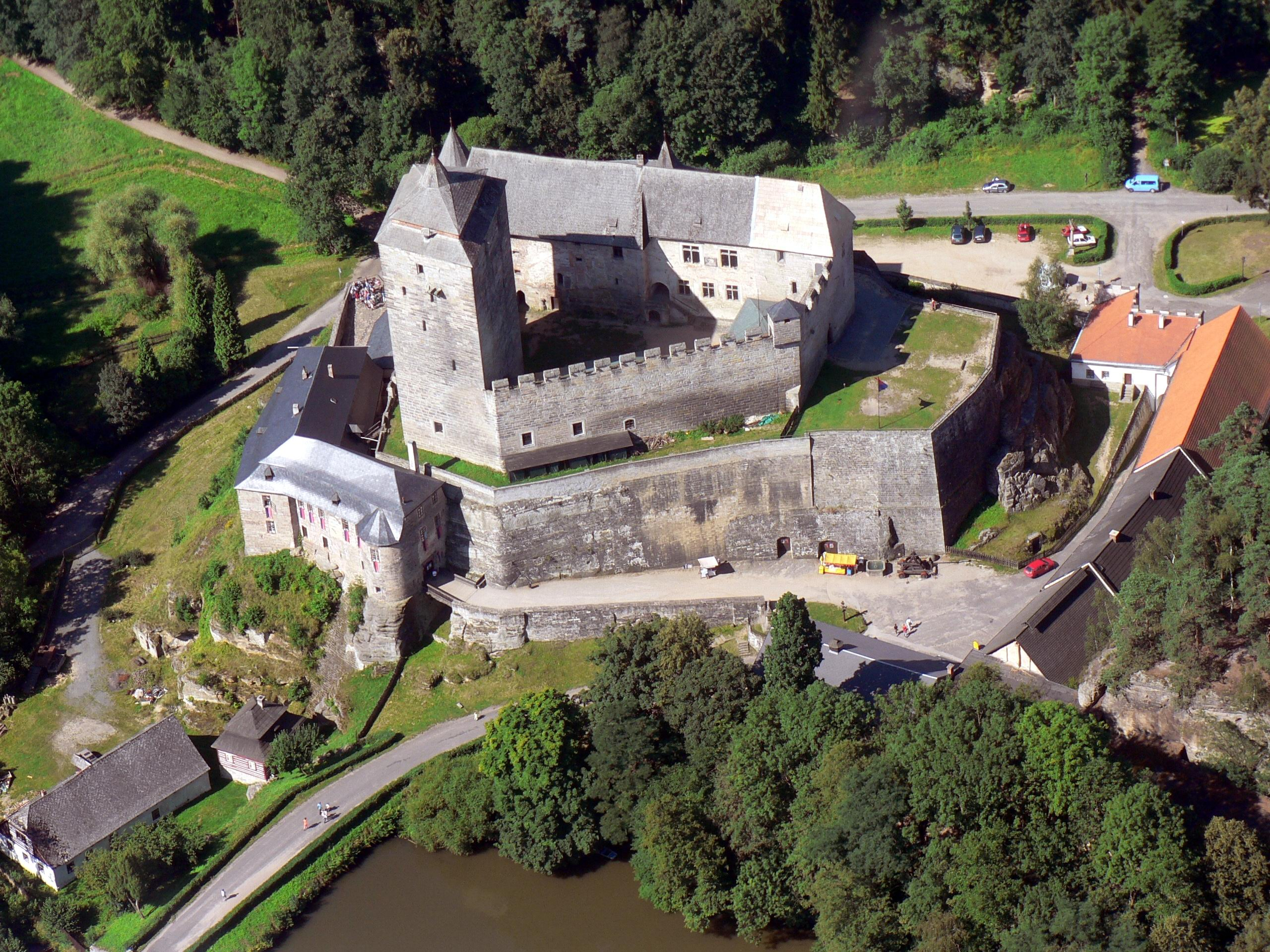
Kost Castle

The first written mention of Libošovice is from 1353. Its history is connected with the Kost Castle, which was built in 1349 at the latest.

== Demographics ==
Historical population

Year	Pop.	±%
1869	1,878	—
1880	1,779	−5.3%
1890	1,765	−0.8%
1900	1,670	−5.4%
1910	1,587	−5.0%

Year	Pop.	±%
1921	1,519	−4.3%
1930	1,382	−9.0%
1950	1,091	−21.1%
1961	1,003	−8.1%
1970	799	−20.3%

Year	Pop.	±%
1980	613	−23.3%
1991	467	−23.8%
2001	451	−3.4%
2011	506	+12.2%
2021	561	+10.9%

Source: Censuses

== Transport ==
Libošovice is located on the railway line Mladá Boleslav–Mladějov.

== Sights ==
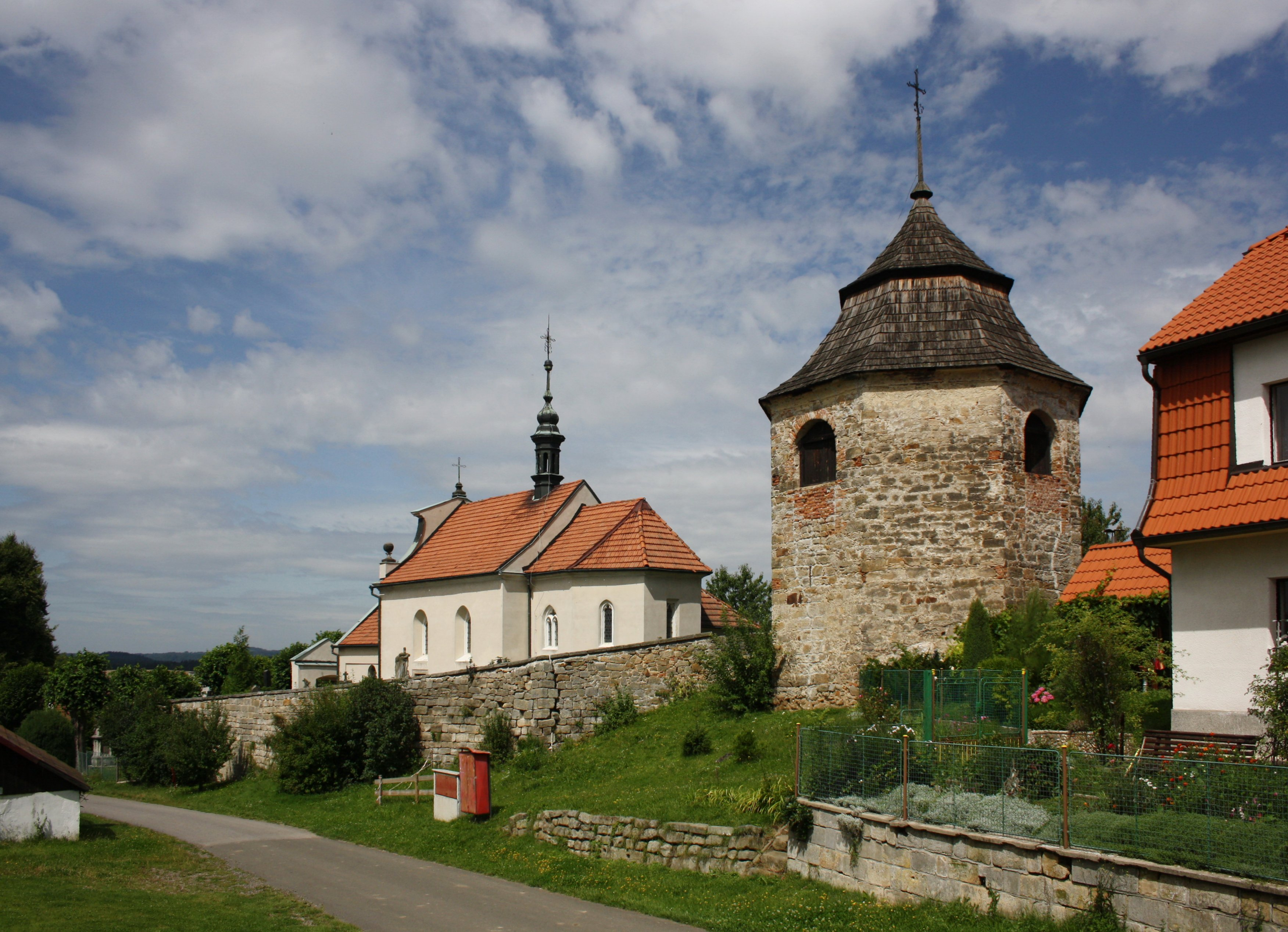
Church of the Finding of the True Cross

Libošovice is known for the Kost Castle, located above Podkost. It is one of the best-preserved Gothic castles in the country, built before 1349, with significant late Gothic and Renaissance reconstructions. For its value, it is protected as a national cultural monument. Today it is open to the public and offers guided tours.

The main landmark of the centre of Libošovice is the Church of Saint Procopius. It was built in the late Gothic style in the second half of the 16th century. In 1874, it was modified to its present form.

The Church of the Finding of the True Cross is located in Nepřívěc. It is a rural Gothic church. Next to the church is a separate octagonal Baroque bell tower. This stone tower was built in 1786 and probably replaced an older wooden bell tower.

For its preserved folk architecture, the village of Vesec u Sobotky is protected as a village monument reservation. It consists of timber-framed storey houses and farm buildings from the 18th and 19th centuries.
