= Richard Rayner =

British author (born 1955)

Richard Rayner (born 15 December 1955) is a British author who now lives in Los Angeles.

== Early life ==
He was born on 15 December 1955 in the northern city of Bradford. Rayner attended schools in Yorkshire and Rydal School in Wales before studying philosophy and law at Emmanuel College, Cambridge. He has worked as an editor at Time Out Magazine, in London, and later on the literary magazine Granta, then based in Cambridge.

== First book ==
Rayner is the author of nine books. His first, Los Angeles Without A Map, was published in 1988. Part-fiction, part-travelogue, this was turned into a movie L.A. Without a Map (for which Rayner co-wrote the screenplay with director Mika Kaurismäki) starring David Tennant, Vinessa Shaw, Julie Delpy, Vincent Gallo, and, in an uncredited part, Johnny Depp.

== 1996–present ==
In 1996, Rayner published The Blue Suit, a memoir about his early life that won an Esquire Non-Fiction Award in the UK, and was described as 'a beguiling portrait of the artist as a writer and a crook' by The New York Times. Novels like The Cloud Sketcher and Devil's Wind followed. Murder Book, another novel, grew out of a time that Rayner spent riding with the Los Angeles Police Department. In 2009, Rayner published A Bright And Guilty Place, a non-fiction historical narrative set in Los Angeles in the late 1920s and early 1930s, featuring various true-life tabloid crimes of the era.

Rayner is a prolific journalist and short-story writer. He has published in The New Yorker, the Los Angeles Times, Esquire, The Times, The Guardian, The Observer and Granta magazine, among others. He wrote about the Los Angeles Riots for Granta magazine, and about the post-Rodney-King Los Angeles Police Department for The New York Times Magazine. Further cover stories for The New York Times Magazine include reporting on issues such as immigration, partner-swapping in Orange County, and women in the US military. His non-fiction work for The New Yorker has included a profile of Robert Redford, and a story about how a Finnish entomologist helped put leaves back on pest-ravaged Beijing trees in time for the 2008 Olympics. Rayner wrote and presented 'Back to Bradford', a documentary for UK's Channel 4 about returning to his home town.

Rayner wrote a monthly column entitled Paperback Writers for the Los Angeles Times. His work has been translated into more than twenty languages. He is married to a Finn, Päivi Suvilehto, and the couple have two sons, Harry and Charlie. He has lived in Venice, California since 1992.

Rayner is the writer and co-creator, with Don Handfield, and executive producer, of the historical drama Knightfall, concerning the downfall and legend of the Knights Templar, which aired in the USA on the History channel, starting late 2017. The show stars Tom Cullen, Jim Carter, and Julian Ovenden, and was shot in Prague in 2016 and 2018. Rayner co-wrote 'The Rift', the first episode of the Steven Spielberg produced reboot of 'Amazing Stories' for Apple TV, aired in April 2020.

Rayner has taught creative writing at King's College Cambridge and the University of Southern California. Currently he teaches in the Theater, Film and Television Department at UCLA.

== Bibliography ==
=== Novels ===
- Los Angeles Without A Map (1988 - adapted for film in 1998)
- The Elephant (1991)
- Murder Book (1998)
- The Cloud Sketcher (2001)
- The Devil's Wind (2005)

=== Short fiction ===
Stories

Title	Year	First published	Reprinted/collected	Notes
After the movie	2007	Rayner, Richard (30 April 2007). "After the movie". The New Yorker.		

=== Non-fiction ===
- "Los Angeles" in The Best Of Granta Reportage, Granta Books, London (1993)
- The Blue Suit (1995), Review: "Portrait Of The Artist As A Writer And A Crook" by Michuko Kakutani, New York Times, October 27, 1995
- "LAPC", New York Times Magazine, January 22, 1995
- "Existential Cowboy", The New Yorker, May 18, 1998
- Drake's Fortune (2002) about the con artist Oscar Hartzell
- The Associates: Four Capitalists Who Created California (2008) features profiles of Collis Huntington, Charles Crocker, Mark Hopkins and Leland Stanford
- "Bug Wars", The New Yorker, August 25, 2008
- A Bright And Guilty Place (2009) about the murderer of Los Angeles underworld figure Charles H. Crawford
- "Channelling Ike". The Talk of the Town. Ink. The New Yorker. 86 (10): 21–22. 26 April 2010.
- Rayner, Richard (19 December 2011). "Everything you need to know about "Tinker Tailor Soldier Spy"". Salon.com. Archived from the original on 20 December 2011.
- "Inside the LAPD, After the Riots" — The Atlantic
