= Hrubá Skála =

- Municipality
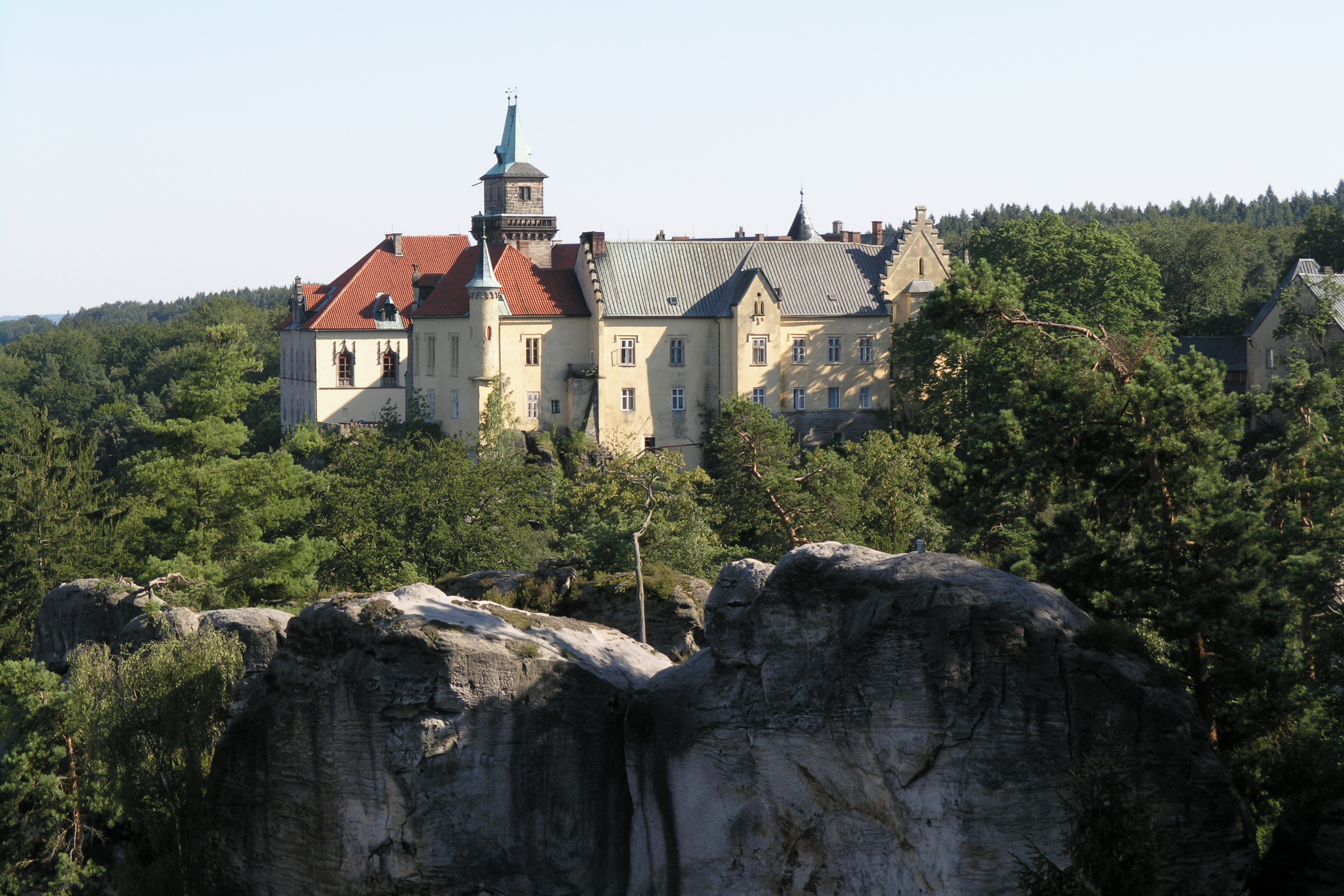
- Hrubá Skála Castle

- Flag Coat of arms

- Location in the Czech Republic
- Coordinates: 50°32′28″N 15°12′11″E
- Country: Czech Republic
- Region: Liberec
- District: Semily
- First mentioned: 1360

Area
  - Total: 13.83 km^{2} (5.34 sq mi)
- Elevation: 287 m (942 ft)

Population (2026-01-01)
  - Total: 600
  - Density: 43/km^{2} (110/sq mi)
- Time zone: UTC+1 (CET)
  - Summer (DST): UTC+2 (CEST)
- Postal codes: 511 01, 512 63
- Website: obechrubaskala.cz

Hrubá Skála (German: Groß Skal) is a municipality and village in Semily District in the Liberec Region of the Czech Republic. It has about 600 inhabitants. It is known for the Hrubá Skála rock town.

== Administrative division ==
Hrubá Skála consists of eight municipal parts (in brackets population according to the 2021 census):

- Hrubá Skála (91)
- Bohuslav (12)
- Borek (27)
- Doubravice (292)
- Hnanice (104)
- Krčkovice (35)
- Rokytnice (36)
- Želejov (12)

== Etymology ==
In Czech, the name Hrubá Skála means 'rough rock'.

== Geography ==
Hrubá Skála is located about 6 kilometres (4 mi) southeast of Turnov and 25 km (16 mi) south of Liberec. It lies in the Jičín Uplands. The highest point is the Stávek hill at 416 m (1,365 ft) above sea level. The Libuňka Stream flows through the municipality. The Jordánka Stream flows through the southern part of the municipal territory and supplies several fishponds there.

Most of the municipality lies in the Bohemian Paradise Protected Landscape Area. West of the Hrubá Skála village is the sandstone Hrubá Skála rock town with sandstone pillars. The area has been protected as the Hruboskalsko Nature Reserve since 1998 and is a popular destination for climbers and hikers.

== History ==
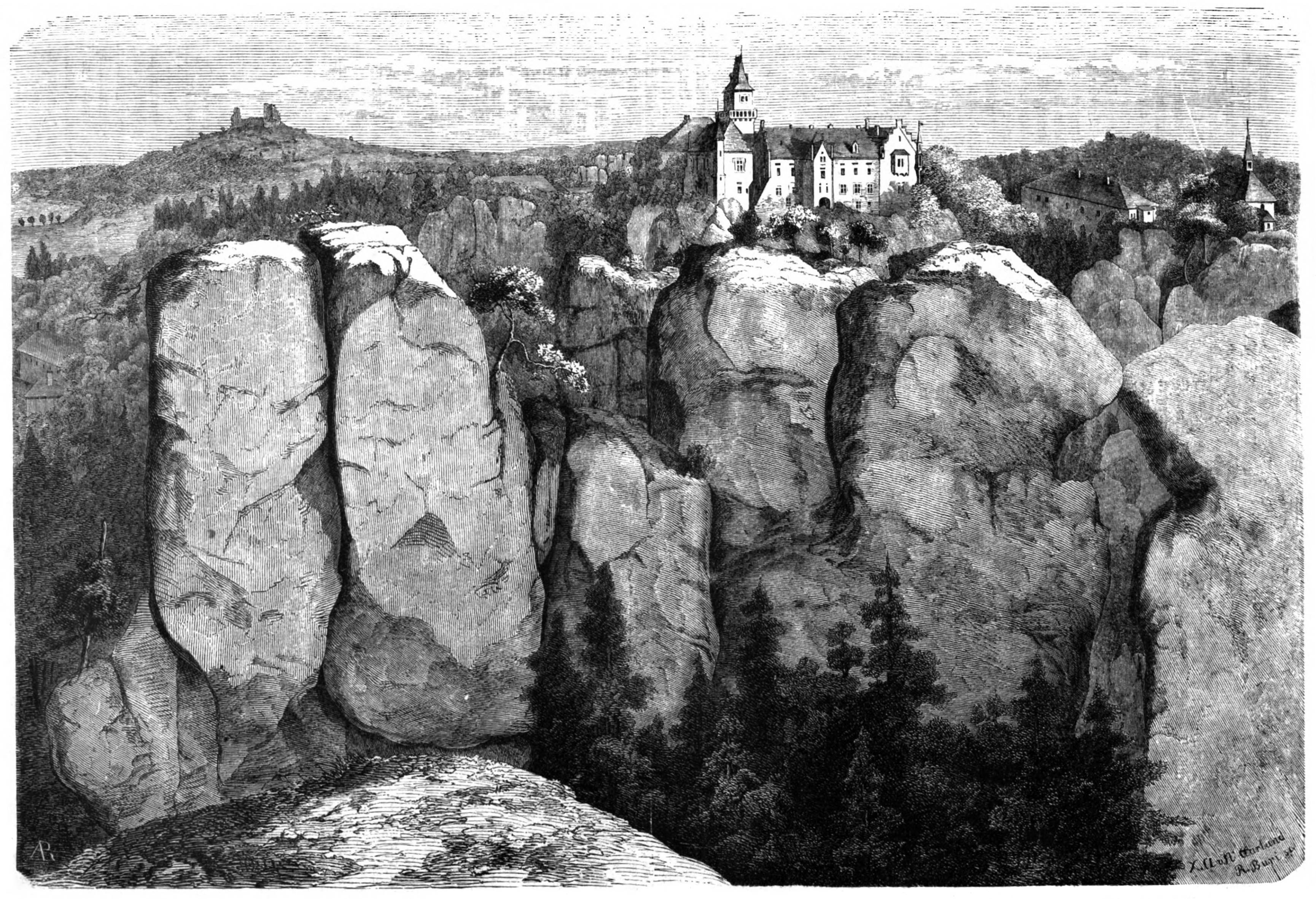
Depiction in Die Gartenlaube (1859)

The castle is situated on a steep sandstone cliff on a rock platform and was originally called Skála. The first written mention of Hrubá Skála Castle is from 1353, seven years before the first mention of the settlement. It was then a possession of the noble Hynek of Waldstein. The estate was called Hrubá Skála to differ it from nearby Malá Skála. His descendants owned the castle until 1416, when it was taken over by the Lords of Jenštejn and then, in 1460, by Zajíc of Hazmburk.

Held by the Lords of Smiřice from 1515 onwards, the rebuilt Renaissance castle had become the centre of one of the largest Bohemian estates with more than 50 villages. Seized by Emperor Ferdinand II upon the 1620 Battle of White Mountain, it was again held by the Waldstein family from 1630 and devastated by both Saxon and Imperial troops during the Thirty Years' War. It was rebuilt in 1710 and again in 1804.

In 1821, Franz de Paula Adam von Waldstein sold Hrubá Skála to Johann Anton Lexa von Aehrenthal. In 1859, Hrubá Skála Castle was again rebuilt, this time in the neo-Gothic style.

After World War II, the Aerenthal family was dispossessed in 1945 and the German-speaking population expelled according to the Beneš decrees.

== Demographics ==
Historical population

Year	Pop.	±%
1869	1,360	—
1880	1,336	−1.8%
1890	1,457	+9.1%
1900	1,357	−6.9%
1910	1,366	+0.7%

Year	Pop.	±%
1921	1,238	−9.4%
1930	1,137	−8.2%
1950	947	−16.7%
1961	807	−14.8%
1970	708	−12.3%

Year	Pop.	±%
1980	658	−7.1%
1991	584	−11.2%
2001	518	−11.3%
2011	585	+12.9%
2021	609	+4.1%

Source: Censuses

== Transport ==
The I/35 road (part of the European route E442) runs through the municipality.

Hrubá Skála is located on the main railway lines from Prague to Turnov and from Hradec Králové to Turnov.

== Sights ==
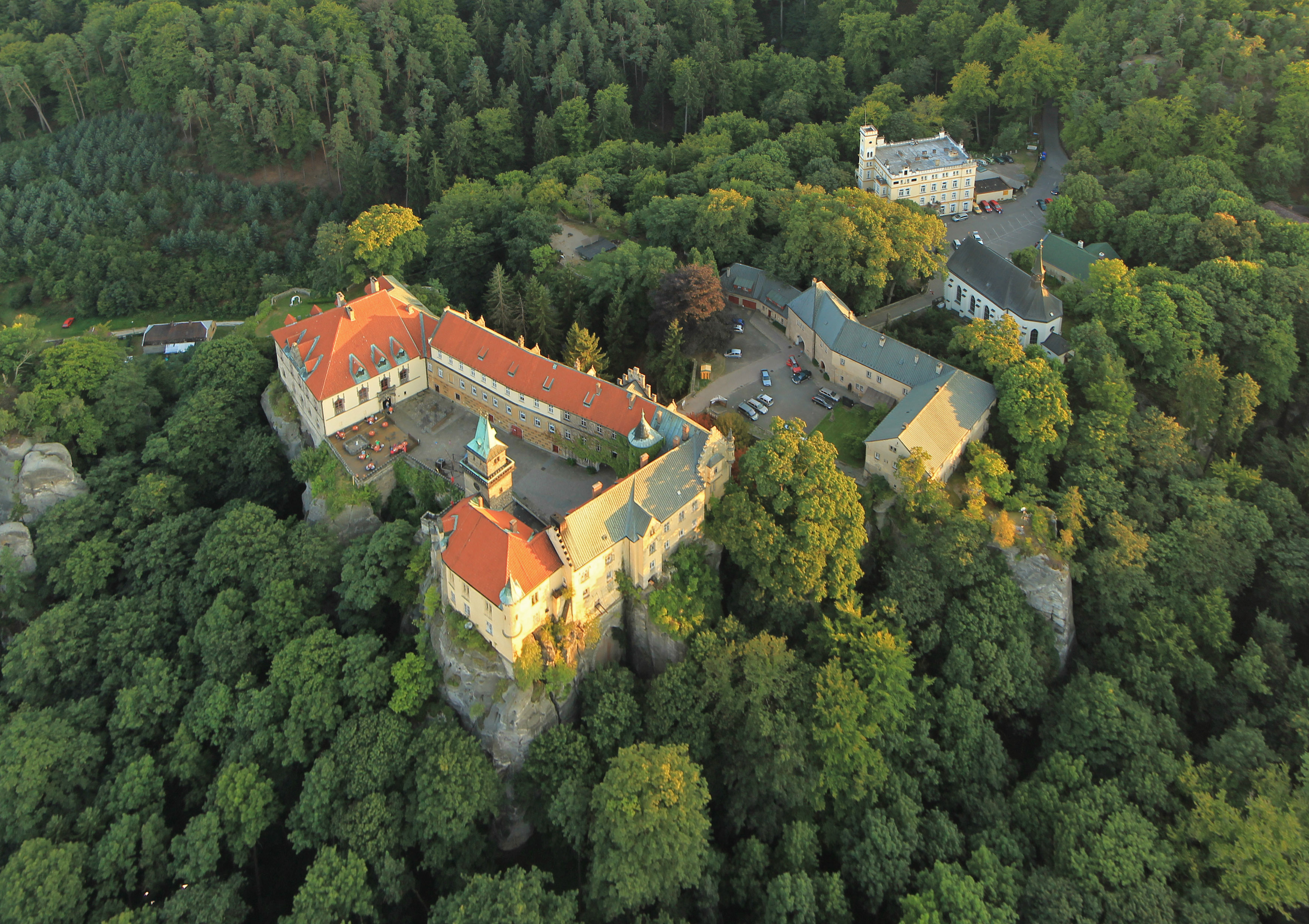
Hrubá Skála Castle and Church of Saint Joseph

The main landmark is the Hrubá Skála Castle. Its present form is a result of modifications from 1923. Under Communist rule, the castle served as a recreation home. Today it serves as a hotel and spa.

The Church of Saint Joseph is located near the castle. It was built in the Neoclassical style in 1812.

== Notable people ==
- Alois Lexa von Aehrenthal (1854–1912), Austro-Hungarian count and politician
