= Bohemian Paradise =

Protected area in the Czech Republic

- IUCN category V (protected landscape/seascape)
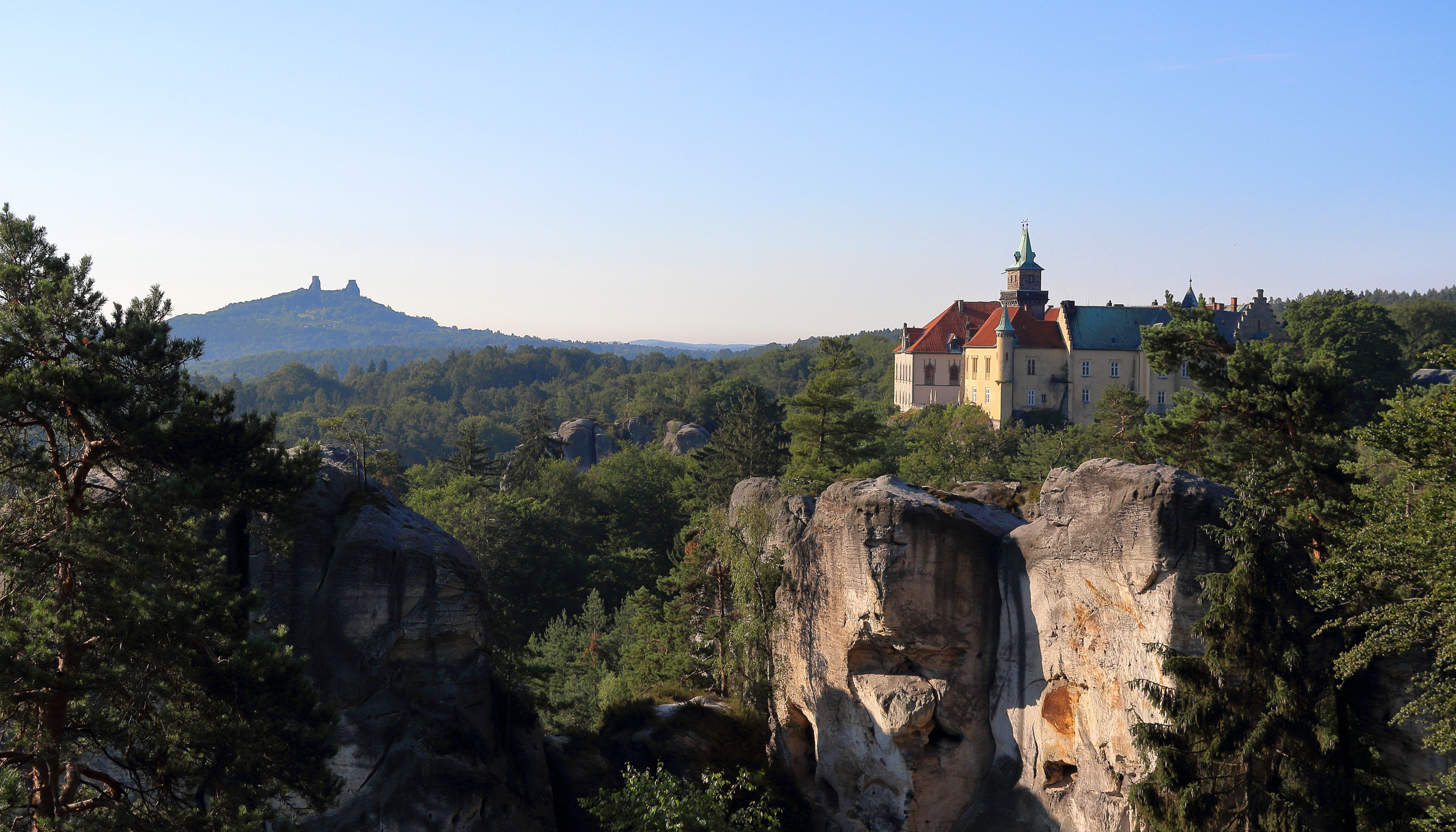
- Interactive map of Bohemian Paradise
- Location: Czech Republic
- Nearest town: Jičín, Turnov
- Coordinates: 50°31′11″N 15°10′14″E
- Area: 181.17 km^{2} (69.95 sq mi)
- Established: 1955

Bohemian Paradise (Czech: Český ráj) is a natural and cultural region in the Czech Republic. It is a designated protected landscape area with an area of 181 km^{2} (70 sq mi).

Bohemian Paradise is also the name of a geopark with an area of 830 square kilometres (320 sq mi), which is the only UNESCO Global Geopark in the Czech Republic.

== Geography ==
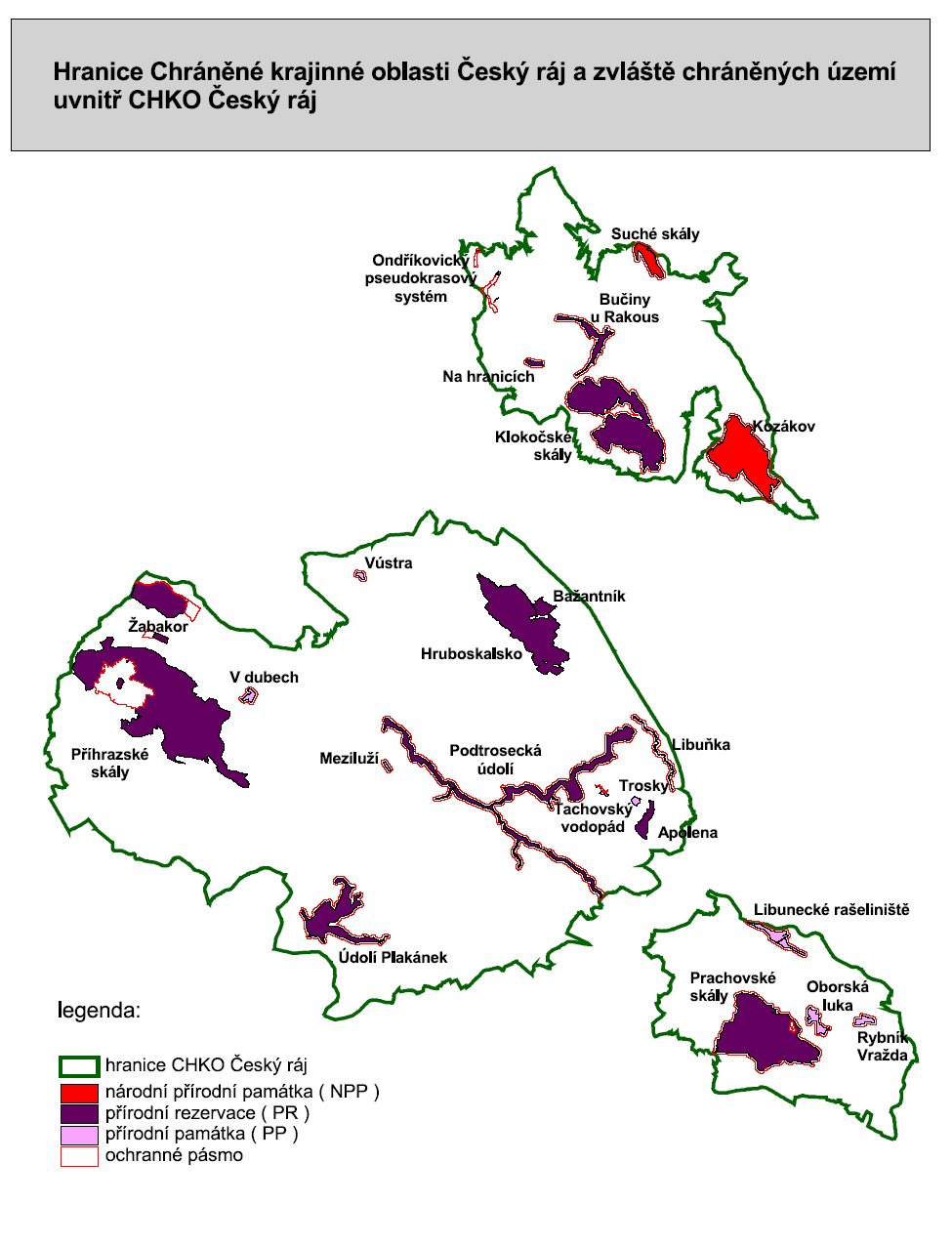
Map of Bohemian Paradise

Bohemian Paradise is located about 60 kilometres (37 mi) northeast of Prague. It extends into the Central Bohemian, Hradec Králové and Liberec regions. The region is located between the towns Jičín, Turnov, Mnichovo Hradiště Železný Brod and Sobotka. The protected landscape area consists of three separate parts. The main river in the area is the Jizera.

From geomorphological point of view, Bohemian Paradise is located mostly in the Jičín Uplands, only the northern part extends into the Ještěd–Kozákov Ridge. The highest point of the protected area is the hill Kozákov at 744 m (2,441 ft). The lowest point is at 233 m (764 ft).

== History ==
The protected area was declared in 1955, as the first nature reserve in the country. At first, it was 95 km^{2} (37 sq mi) in area. In 2002, the area increased to the current 181.17 km^{2} (69.95 sq mi).

== Natural environment ==
One of the most recognizable elements of Bohemian Paradise is the sandstone rock which many of the surrounding towns are constructed of. There are many rocks which have been shaped by wind, water, frost, erosion, and humans into unique shapes. These include, for instance, the Hrubé, Suché, and Klokočské Rocks.

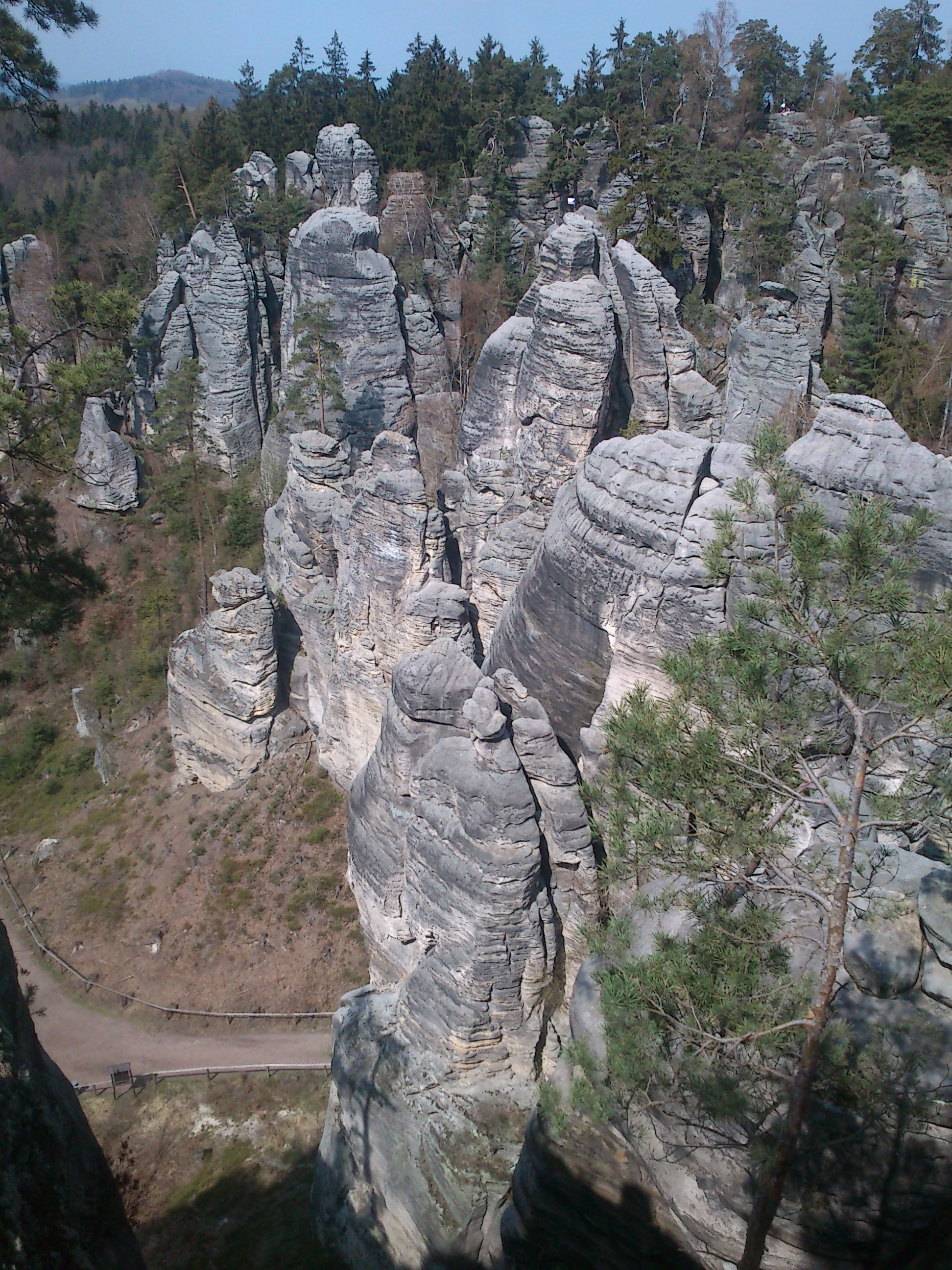
Prachovské skály

The Prachov Rocks area of rock formations is particularly noteworthy. Since 1933, the area with 60 million year old formations has been a protected natural reserve. Some scenes for major television and film productions were filmed here.

The Hrubá Skála rock town area (Hruboskalské skalní město), with volcanic sandstone pillars, is also significant. A chateau, also called Hrubá Skála, is located high up on a rock platform. The original mansion was built in the 14th century but was extensively damaged over the years and re-built several times, finally in the style of a Renaissance chateau. The property is now operated as a hotel and spa.

Kozákov is the highest hill in the area. There are a tourist chalet and a lookout tower. Kozákov was originally a volcano. Thus, it is a place where precious stones are found. The treatment of these gems has been connected with the history of the city of Turnov called "The heart of the Bohemian Paradise" for several centuries.

Trosky Castle, consisting of two 14th-century ruins, is located high on the summits of two basalt volcanic plugs, 15 km from Turnov; the caves nearby can also be visited.

Other places of interest in Bohemian Paradise are the Bozkov dolomite caves, which contain the largest underground lake in the Czech Republic. The Podtrosecké Valley is situated below the ruins of Trosky Castle, one of the symbols of Bohemian Paradise. The valley is known for its countryside and several ponds, e.g., Věžák, Nebák, Vidlák. Plakánek valley begins near the Kost Castle and ends in the settlement Rašovec. There is a cycle route in this area. There are also a variety of ruins in the region, including Frýdštějn Castle and Valdštejn Castle.

== Cultural sights ==
Two well-known castles in the area are Trosky and Kost. Other castles in the area include Sychrov, Hrubý Rohozec, Hrubá Skála, and Humprecht. There are also many castle ruins, such as Frýdštejn and Valdštejn, and some buildings built in folk architecture style, for instance, Dlaskův and Boučkův Estates.

== Gallery ==
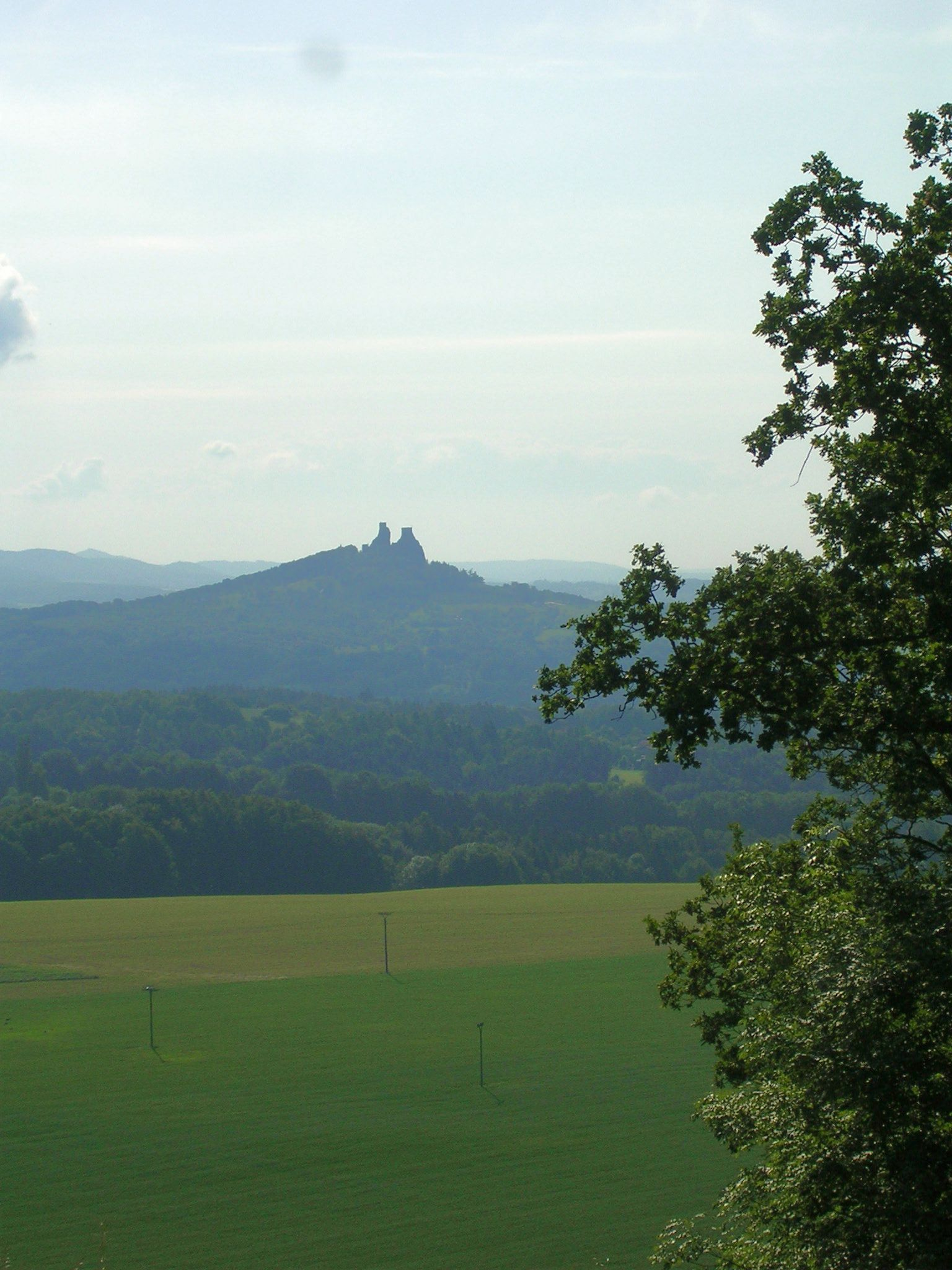
Trosky Castle,
symbol of Bohemian Paradise

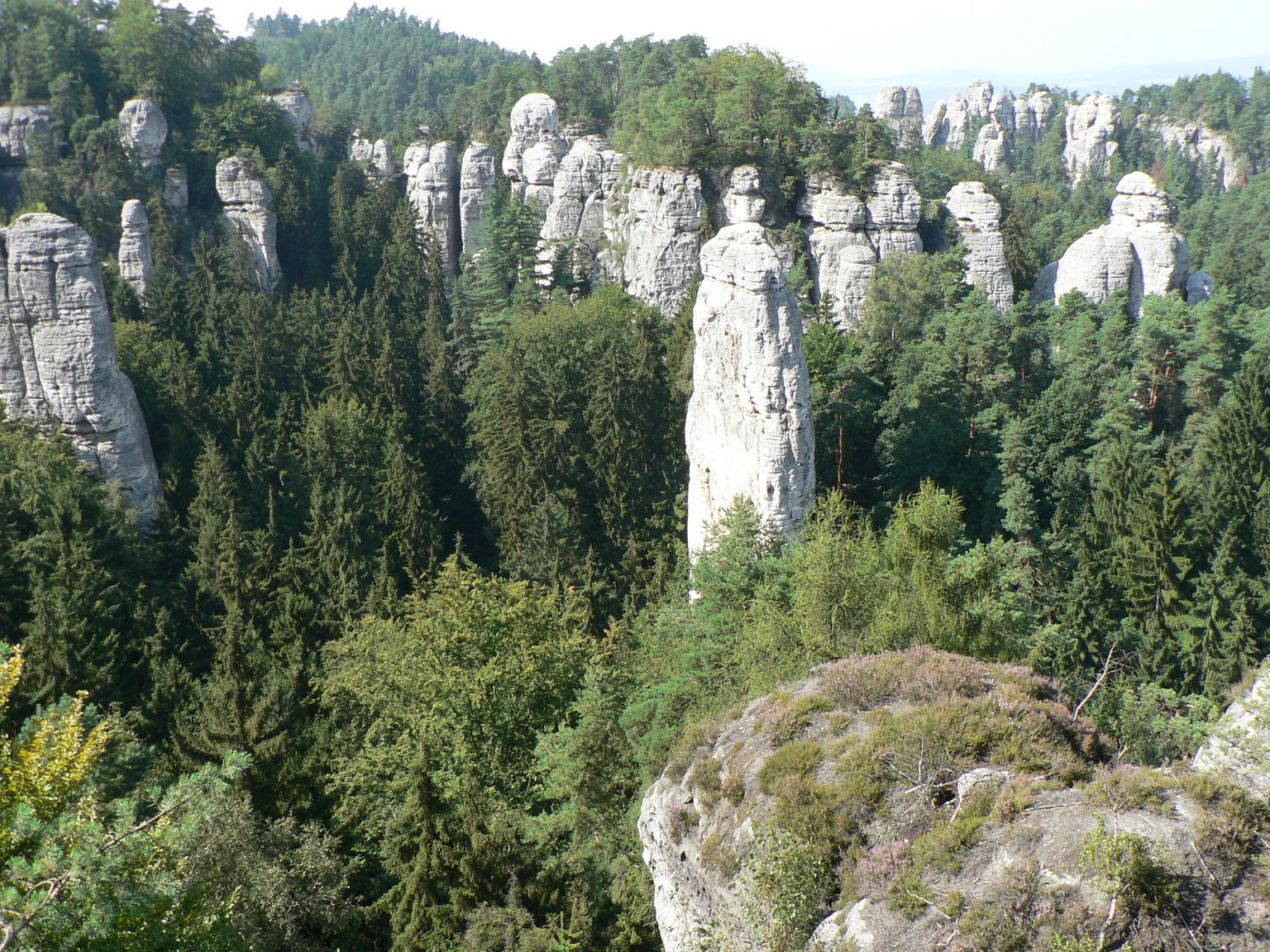
Hrubá Skála rock town

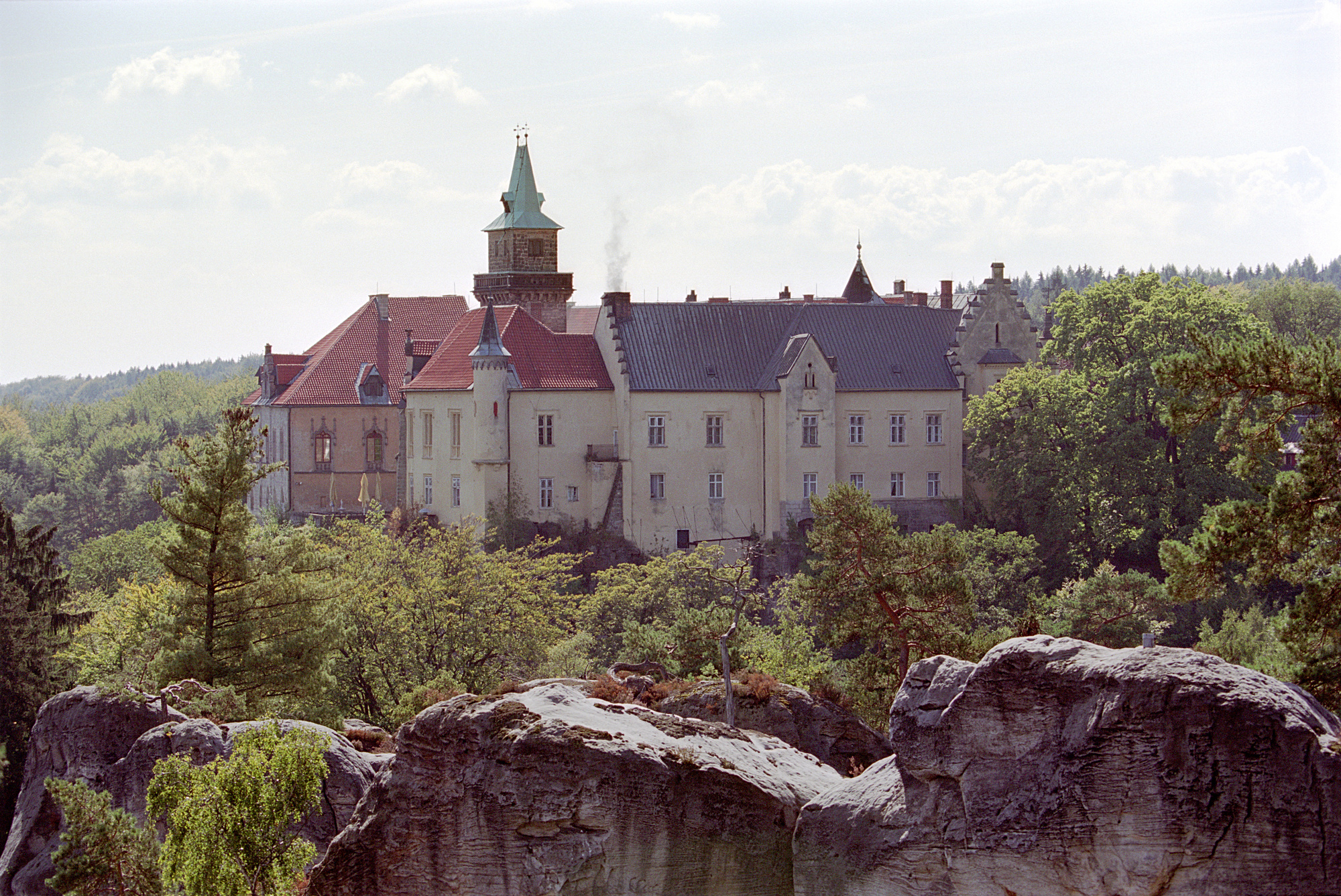
Hrubá Skála Castle (now a hotel)

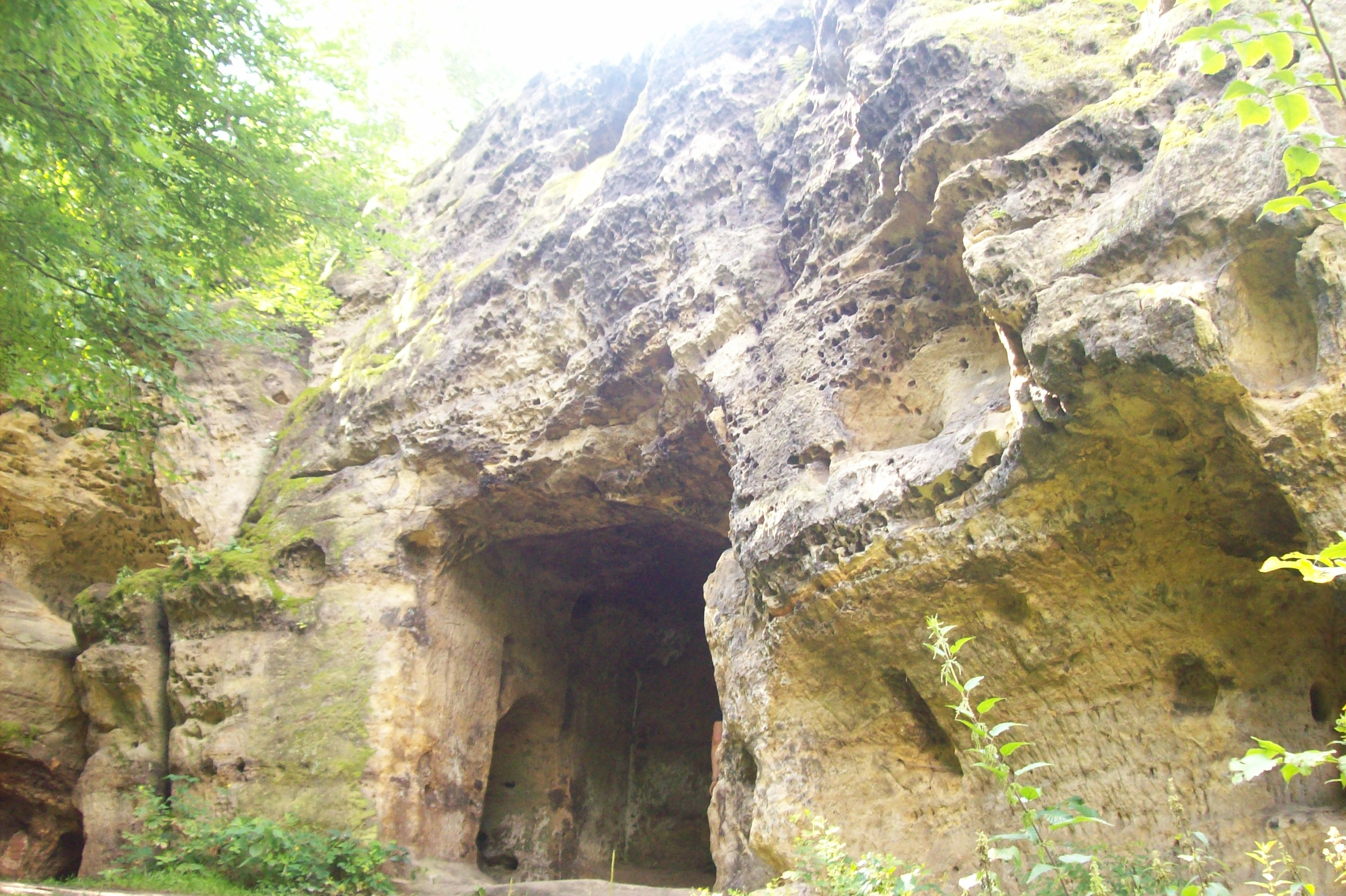
Dwelling in rock

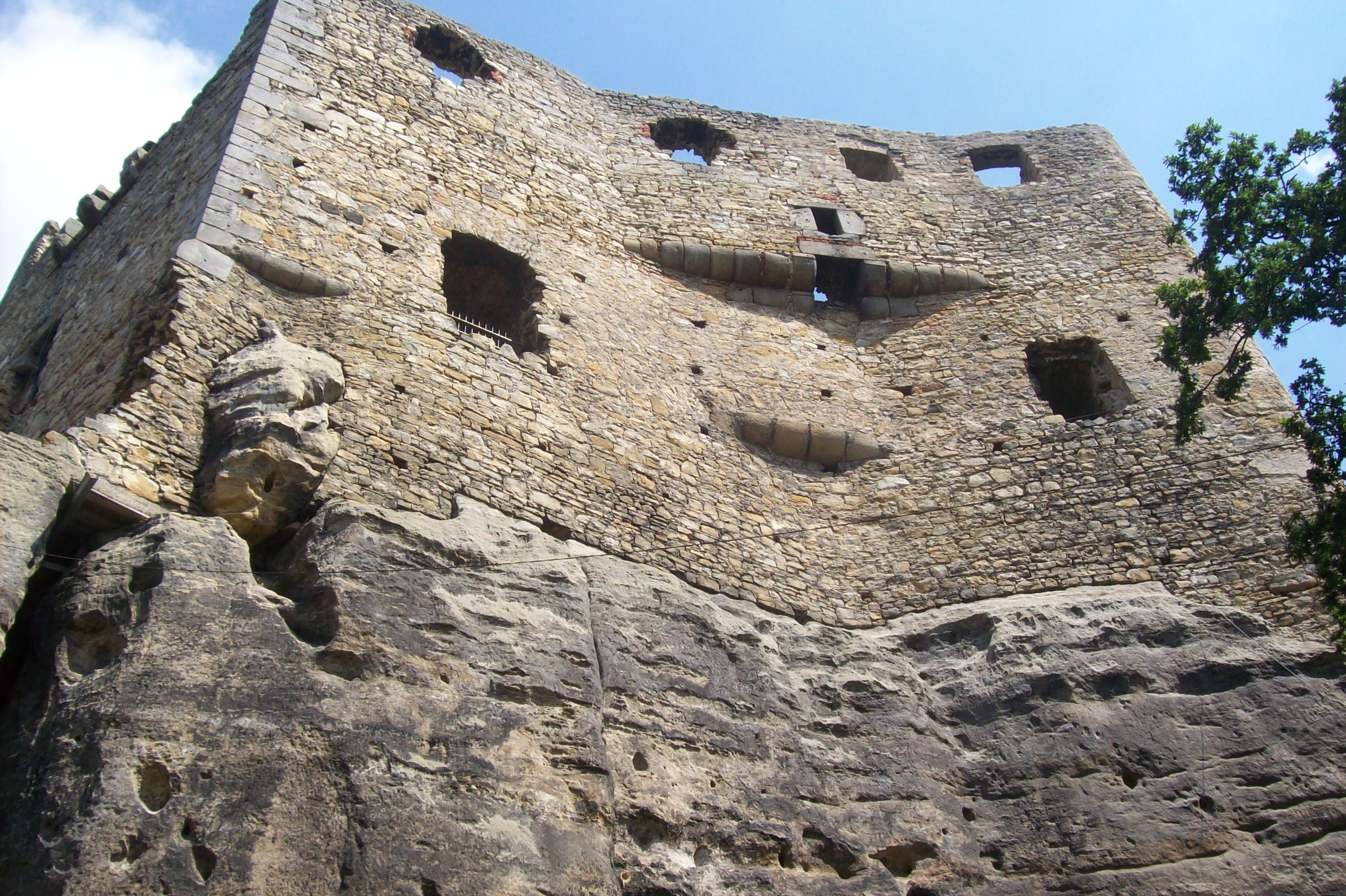
Valečov Castle

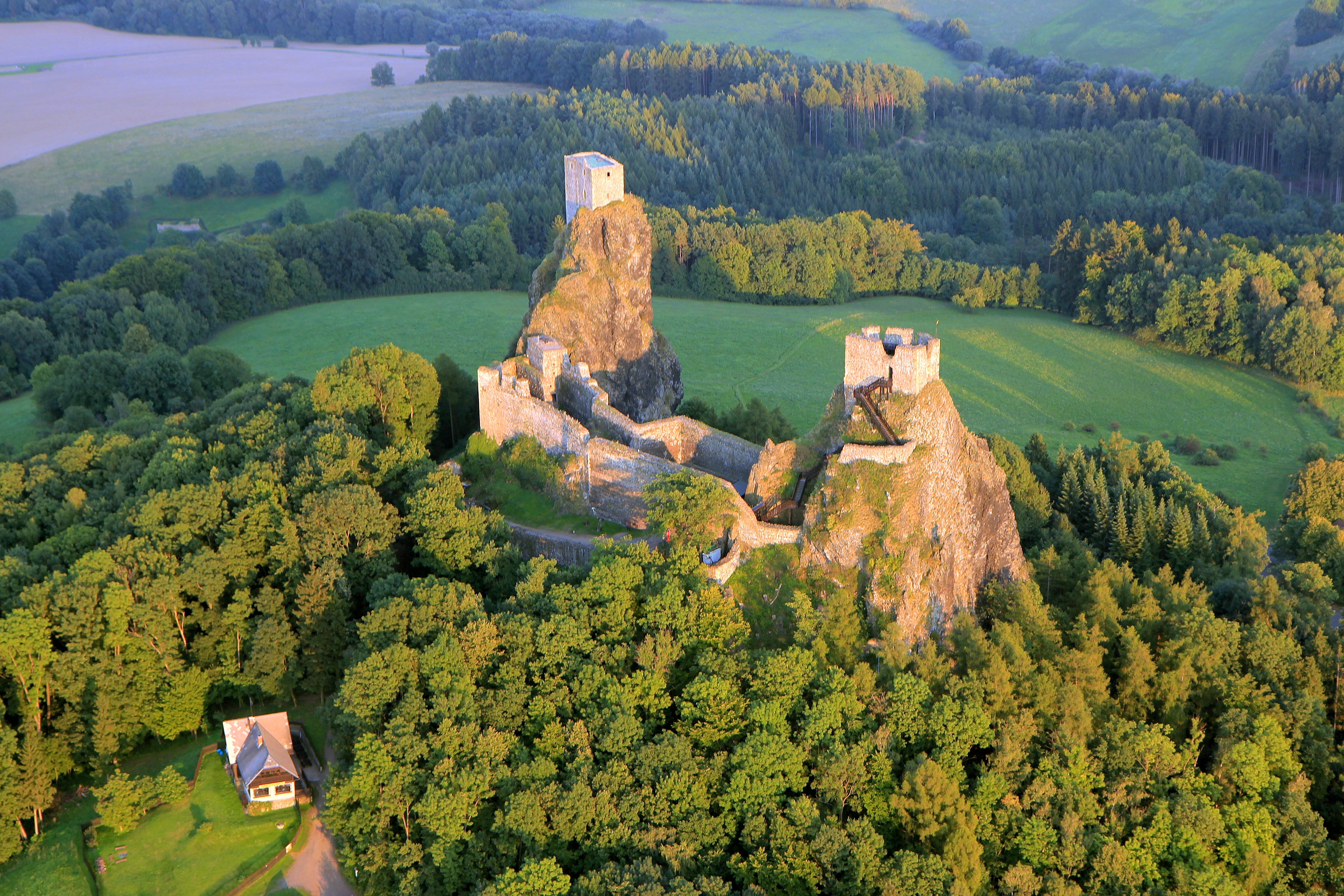
Aerial View of Trosky Castle
