= Kost Castle =

Gothic castle in Libošovice, Czech Republic

Coordinates: 50°29′25″N 15°08′06″E

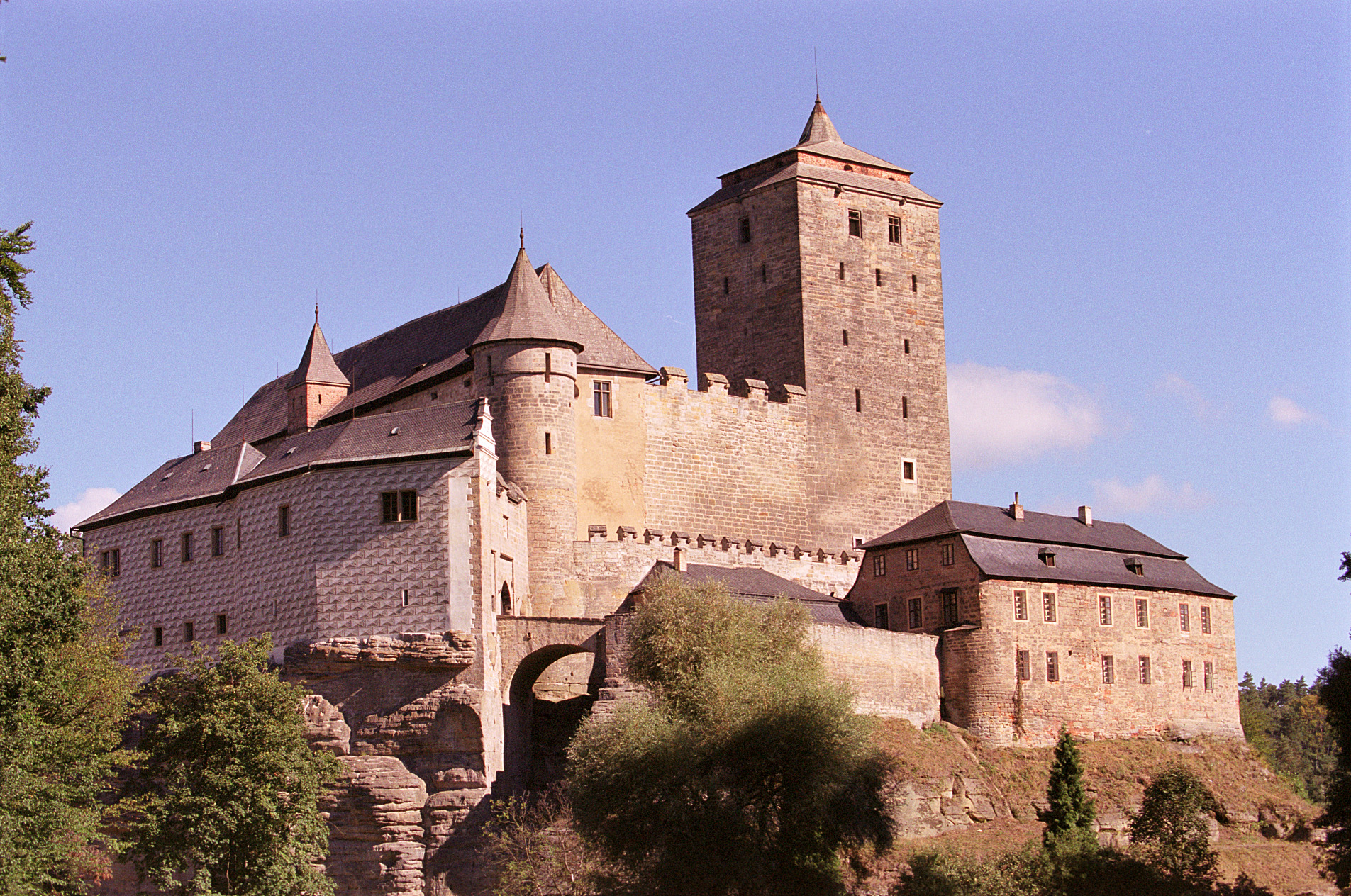
Kost Castle

Kost Castle (Czech: hrad Kost) is a Gothic castle in Libošovice municipality in Jičín District in the Hradec Králové Region of the Czech Republic. It lies in the nature region of Bohemian Paradise and is owned by Kinský dal Borgo noble family.

== History and description ==
It was founded by Beneš von Wartenberg before 1349 as a possible construction site and was completed by his sons Peter and Marquard von Wartenberg in a high gothic style. It retains most of the original features and is overall very well preserved and maintained.

The castle is known for its donjon, so-called Bílá věž ("white tower"), protected by two circles of fortress walls. In 1414 the family of Zajíc von Hasenburg moved there, because Nicolaus von Hasenburg married Skunka, a widow after Peter von Wartenberg. Later the castle was owned by families of Schellenberg (1497–1524), Biberstein (1524–1551), Lobkowicz (till 1576) and others. During centuries some more buildings were built near the castle and joined to it.

Unlike most other castles in Bohemia, it does not lie on a hill, but on a spit between two brooks. Another peculiarity is the tower, which has a trapezoid-like ground-plan. The trapezoidal tower has the corners facing the areas of most likely catapult attacks. This is to make the missiles glance off the tower walls instead of hitting it head on, thereby minimizing damage.
