= 1314 =

1314 in various calendars
- Gregorian calendar: 1314; MCCCXIV
- Ab urbe condita: 2067
- Armenian calendar: 763; ԹՎ ՉԿԳ
- Assyrian calendar: 6064
- Balinese saka calendar: 1235–1236
- Bengali calendar: 720–721
- Berber calendar: 2264
- English Regnal year: 7 Edw. 2 – 8 Edw. 2
- Buddhist calendar: 1858
- Burmese calendar: 676
- Byzantine calendar: 6822–6823
- Chinese calendar: 癸丑年 (Water Ox); 4011 or 3804 — to — 甲寅年 (Wood Tiger); 4012 or 3805
- Coptic calendar: 1030–1031
- Discordian calendar: 2480
- Ethiopian calendar: 1306–1307
- Hebrew calendar: 5074–5075
- Hindu calendars
- Vikram Samvat: 1370–1371
- Shaka Samvat: 1235–1236
- Kali Yuga: 4414–4415
- Holocene calendar: 11314
- Igbo calendar: 314–315
- Iranian calendar: 692–693
- Islamic calendar: 713–714
- Japanese calendar: Shōwa 3 (正和３年)
- Javanese calendar: 1225–1226
- Julian calendar: 1314; MCCCXIV
- Korean calendar: 3647
- Minguo calendar: 598 before ROC 民前598年
- Nanakshahi calendar: −154
- Thai solar calendar: 1856–1857
- Tibetan calendar: ཆུ་མོ་གླང་ལོ་ (female Water-Ox); 1440 or 1059 or 287 — to — ཤིང་ཕོ་སྟག་ལོ་ (male Wood-Tiger); 1441 or 1060 or 288

1314 (MCCCXIV) was a common year starting on Tuesday of the Julian calendar, the 1314th year of the Common Era (CE) and Anno Domini (AD) designations, the 314th year of the 2nd millennium, the 14th year of the 14th century, and the 5th year of the 1310s decade. As of the start of 1314, the Gregorian calendar was 8 days ahead of the Julian calendar, which was the dominant calendar of the time.

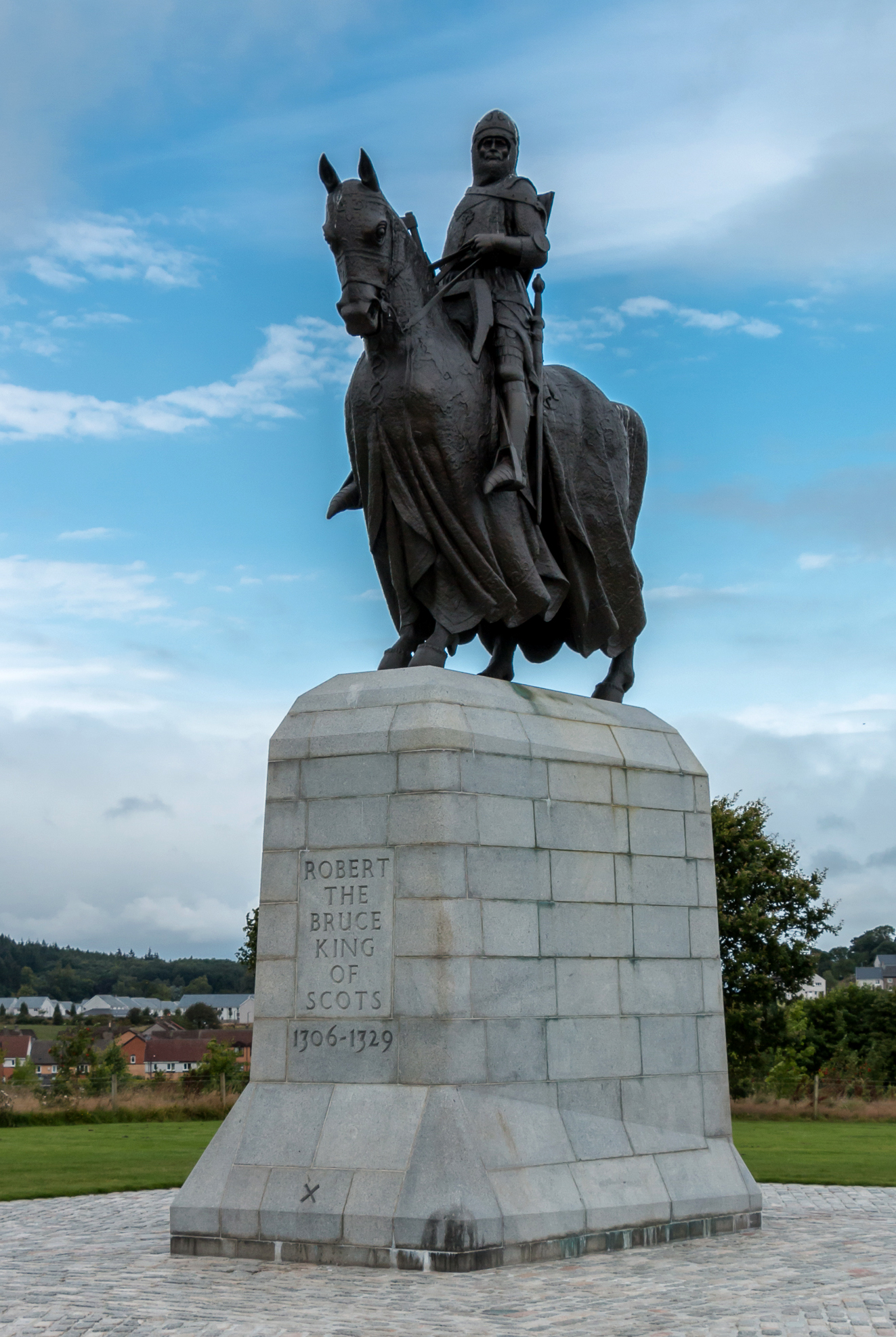
Statue of Robert the Bruce, Scottish victor over England at the Battle of Bannockburn

Battle of Bannockburn — first day

Battle of Bannockburn — second day

== Events ==
=== January – March ===
- January 17 – Queen Oljath, who had been the Queen consort of the Kingdom of Georgia as wife of King Vakhtang II (d. 1292), and then his cousin, King David VIII (d. 1311), marries a third time, taking as her husband Qara Sonqur, Governor of Maragheh (in the modern-day East Azerbaijan province of Iran), in exchange for a dowry of 30,000 dinars.
- January 21 (3 Shawwal 713 AH) – Muhammad III of Granada, Sultan from 1302 to 1309, is murdered by being drowned in the pool of the Dar al-Kubra on orders of his brother, Sultan Nasr.
- February 8 (21 Shawwal 713 AH) – Sultan Nasr of Granada is forced to abdicate after 18 days as the ruler of the Emirate of Granada (in modern-day Spain) by his nephew, Abu'l-Walid Ismail I ibn Faraj, who is proclaimed at the Alhambra as the new Sultan.
- March 18 – Jacques de Molay, Grand Master of the Knights Templar and Geoffroi de Charney, are, by orders of King Philip IV of France ("Philip the Fair"), burned at the stake in front of the cathedral of Notre-Dame de Paris on the Île de la Cité in the Seine. Jacques declares his innocence and that the Templar Order is also innocent of all the charges of heresy. It is said that Jacques correctly predicts the deaths of both Philip and Pope Clement V within the year.
- March – Tour de Nesle Affair: After confirmation that two of his sons' wives are engaged in adultery, King Philip IV of France orders the arrest of his daughters-in-law, Margaret of Burgundy (the wife of Prince Louis X), Blanche of Burgundy (wife of Prince Charles of Valois), and Joan II, Countess of Burgundy (wife of Prince Philip V). The arrests come after the accusations of King Philip's daughter, Isabella, Queen consort of England, and surveillance of the Tower of Nesle. Joan II is charged with being an accessory for being aware of the crime and not reporting it, and put under house arrest until after King Philip's death later in the year. Blanche is imprisoned at the Château Gaillard until 1322. Margaret will die of illness in prison a year later, and five months after technically becoming Queen consort of France. Two knights, Philip of Aunay and his older brother Walter of Aunay, are also arrested for adultery (with Margaret and Blanche respectively), imprisoned, tortured at the Place du Grand Martroy in Pontoise and brutally executed on April 19.

=== April – June ===
- April 4 – Exeter College, Oxford, in England is founded by Walter Stapledon, Bishop of Exeter, and his brother for the education of clergy.
- April 20 – Pope Clement V dies after an 9-year pontificate at Roquemaure. During his reign, he has reorganized and centralized the administration of the Catholic Church.
- May 1 – The 1314–1316 papal conclave to elect a successor to Pope Clement V begins at Carpentras Cathedral in Provence with 23 cardinals in attendance, of whom the votes of 16 are necessary to elect a new Pontiff. The cardinals are divided into three factions, none of which have more than eight people, with a group from Italy (led by Guillaume de Mandagot), who want to move the papacy back to Rome; nine from Gascony, most of whom are relatives of Pope Clement (led by Arnaud de Pellegrue); and five from Provence (led by Berengar Fredol).
- May 14 – In Italy, more than 50 of the Fraticelli spiritualists of the Franciscan order of Tuscany are excommunicated from the Roman Catholic Church by the Archbishop of Genoa after refusing to return to obedience to the Pope.
- June 17 – First War of Scottish Independence: English forces led by King Edward II leave Berwick-upon-Tweed to march to break the Scottish siege of Stirling Castle. They cross the River Tweed at Wark and Coldstream and march west across the flat Merse of Berwickshire towards Lauderdale. In Earlston, Edward uses an old Roman road through the Lammermuir Hills, practical for the wheeled transport of a long supply train as well as the cavalry and infantry.
- June 19 – English forces march to the environs of Edinburgh; here Edward II waits for the wagon train of over 200 baggage and supply wagons – which straggle behind the long columns, to catch up. At the nearby port of Leith, English supply ships land stores for the army – who will be well rested before the 35-mile (56 km) march that will bring them to Stirling Castle, before the deadline of June 24.
- June 23 – Battle of Bannockburn begins: English forces approach the Scottish positions at Torwood, mounted troops under Gilbert de Clare are confronted by Scottish forces and repulsed. During the fierce fighting, Henry de Bohun is killed in a duel by King Robert the Bruce. Edward II and forward elements, mainly cavalry, encamp at Bannockburn near Stirling in central Scotland. The baggage train and the majority of the forces arrive in the evening.
- June 24 – Battle of Bannockburn (First War of Scottish Independence): Scottish forces (some 8,000 men) led by Robert the Bruce defeat the English army at Bannockburn, securing de facto independence for Scotland. During the battle, the Scottish pikemen formed in schiltrons (or phalanx) repulses the English cavalry (some 2,000 men). Edward II flees with his bodyguard (some 500 men), while panic spreads among the remaining forces, turning their defeat into a rout. Stirling Castle is surrendered to the Scots.
- June 25 – Edward II arrives at Dunbar Castle, and takes safely a ship to Bamburgh in Northumberland. His mounted escort takes the coastal route from Dunbar to Berwick.

=== July – September ===
- July 14 – The Italian cardinals participating in the papal conclave in France walk out after weeks of harassment by supporters of a French candidate for pope. The rest of the College of Cardinals disperse to Avignon, seat of the Papacy; Orange, in the modern-day département of Vaucluse, and Valence in the modern-day département of Drôme. The conclave will not meet again for two years, during which time there is no Pope.
- August 14 – Scottish raiders led by Edward Bruce plunder the north-eastern counties of England in the Pennines; they are attacked at Stainmore by the English under Andrew Harclay.
- August 31 – King Haakon V of Norway moves his capital from Bergen to Oslo – where he builds Akershus Fortress, from which Norway is ruled for the next 500 years.
- September 29 – In exchange for captured English nobles, Edward II releases Elizabeth de Burgh, wife of Robert the Bruce, his sister Mary Bruce, and his daughter Marjorie Bruce.

=== October – December ===
- October 19 – 19 October 1314 imperial election for the Holy Roman Emperor at Sachsenhausen (Frankfurt am Main). The 25-year-old Frederick the Fair of the House of Habsburg is elected by four of the electors and is crowned at Bonn Minster on November 25; however, in a dispute over validity of the election, Louis IV the Bavarian of the House of Wittelsbach is elected the following day by the remaining three electors and is crowned at Aachen, leading to civil war in the Empire.
- November 29 – Louis X ("Louis the Quarrelsome") becomes King of France after his father, King Philip IV, is killed in a hunting accident at Fontainebleau.
- December 3 – The state funeral and burial of King Philip IV takes place at the Basilica of Saint-Denis near Paris.
- December 9 – Brandenburg–Pomeranian conflict: In Germany, the Margraviate of Brandenburg renounces all claims to the region around Loitz (in the modern-day northeast German state of Mecklenburg-Vorpommern) to the Principality of Rügen in Denmark in return for payment.

=== Undated ===
- Stephen II becomes ruler (ban) of Bosnia following the death of his father Stephen I Kotromanić. He rules the lands from the river Sava to the Adriatic Sea, but does not effectively come into full power until 1322.
- Amda Seyon I, known as "the Pillar of Zion" begins his reign as Emperor of Ethiopia, during which he expands into Muslim territory to the southeast by incorporating a number of smaller states.

=== By topic ===
==== Religion ====
- The Ozbek Han Mosque is built in the realm of Özbeg Khan in the Crimea.
- Completion of Old St Paul's Cathedral in London.

==== Natural environment ====
- Approximate date – Volcanic eruption of Mount Tarawera in New Zealand; there are few settlers here at this time.

== Births ==
- January 13 – John Bardolf, English nobleman and peerage (d. 1363)
- March 10 – Ramathibodi I, Thai nobleman, prince and ruler (d. 1369)
- May 13 – Sergius of Radonezh, Russian abbot and reformer (d. 1392)
- June 24 – Philippa of Hainault, queen consort of Edward III (d. 1369)
- October 18 – Giles de Badlesmere, English nobleman and knight (d. 1338)
- date unknown
  - Akmal al-Din al-Babarti, Syrian scholar and theologian (d. 1384)
  - John of Arkel, Dutch nobleman, bishop and prince-bishop (d. 1378)
  - Li Shanchang, Chinese official, chancellor and politician (d. 1390)
  - Toqto'a (or "Dayong", Chinese official, historian and writer (d. 1356)
  - Valdemar III, King of Denmark from the House of Estridsen (d. 1364)
  - William Devereux the Younger, English nobleman (d. 1384)

== Deaths ==
- January 21 – Muhammad III, Nasrid ruler (sultan) (b. 1257)
- January 30 – Nicholas III of Saint Omer, Latin nobleman
- February 8 – Helen of Anjou, Queen of Serbia (b. 1235)
- February 10 – Riccardo Petroni, Italian cardinal (b. 1250)
- March 4 – Jakub Świnka, Polish priest and archbishop
- March 18
  - Geoffroy de Charney, French nobleman and preceptor
  - Jacques de Molay, French nobleman and Grand Master
- April 20 – Clement V, pope of the Catholic Church (b. 1264)
- May 3 – Emilia Bicchieri, Italian nun and prioress (b. 1238)
- May 31 – James Salomoni, Italian priest, prior and saint (b. 1231)
- June 23 – Henry de Bohun, English nobleman, knight and duelist
- June 24 – (Battle of Bannockburn)
  - Gilbert de Clare, English nobleman, knight and peerage (b. 1291)
  - Giles d'Argentan, Norman nobleman, favourite and knight (b. 1280)
  - Robert Clifford, English nobleman, knight and High Sheriff (b. 1274)
  - William de Vescy, Norman nobleman, knight and peerage (b. 1296)
  - William Marshal, English nobleman, knight and Marshal of Ireland
- September 30 – Yolanda I, French noblewoman and ruler (suo jure) (b. 1257)
- October 21 – Geoffrey de Geneville, English nobleman and diplomat (b. 1226)
- November 20 – Albert II the Degenerate, German ruler and knight (b. 1240)
- November 25 – Nicholas "the Child", German nobleman and knight (b. 1261)
- November 29 – Philip IV the Fair, King of France from the House of Capet, in a hunting accident (b. 1268)
- date unknown
  - Ahmed al-Ghubrini, Algerian scholar, biographer and chronicler (b. 1264)
  - Alan la Zouche, English nobleman, knight, governor and steward (b. 1267)
  - Alexander Bonini, Italian Minister General, philosopher and writer (b. 1270)
  - Ermengol X, Spanish nobleman and adviser (House of Cabrera) (b. 1254)
  - Guo Shoujing, Chinese astronomer, mathematician and politician (b. 1231)
  - Henry Percy, English nobleman, landowner, magnate and knight (b. 1273)
  - John Balliol ("Toom Tabard"), king of Scotland (House of Balliol) (b. 1249)
  - Nicholas III, Hungarian nobleman and Master of the Treasury (b. 1285)
  - Nikō, Japanese Buddhist monk, teacher and religious leader (b. 1253)
  - Rainier I, Genoese nobleman and knight (House of Grimaldi) (b. 1267)
  - Sanggye Pal, Tibetan teacher and Imperial Preceptor (dishi) (b. 1267)
  - Stephen I Kotromanić, Bosnian nobleman (ban) and ruler (b. 1242)
  - Takezaki Suenaga, Japanese nobleman, retainer and samurai (b. 1246)
  - Violante Manuel, Spanish noblewoman and princess (infanta) (b. 1265)
  - William Devereux, English nobleman, landowner and knight (b. 1244)
  - Zhu Shije (or "Hanqing"), Chinese mathematician and writer (b. 1249)
  - Wedem Arad, Emperor of Ethiopia
