= Philip of Aunay =

Norman knight (ca 1290–1314)

Philip of Aunay or Aulnay (Philippe d'Aunay or d'Aulnay) (c. 1290/93 – 19 April 1314, Pontoise), was a Norman knight implicated in a French royal scandal known as the Tour de Nesle affair.

== Biography ==
In the court of Philip IV of France, Philip of Aunay was the equerry to the king's younger brother Charles of Valois, and his older brother Walter of Aunay (also known as Gautier) was equerry to Philip, the king's second son. Philip and Gautier were implicated in what would later be known as the Tour de Nesle affair, in which the king's three daughters-in-law were accused of adultery. Philip was accused of adultery with Margaret of Burgundy, wife of the king's eldest son, Louis, and Gautier was linked to Blanche of Burgundy, wife of the king's youngest son, Charles. The brothers were tortured at the Place du Grand Martroy in Pontoise. Both confessed to adultery and were found guilty, therefore, of lèse-majesté. They were beaten and skinned alive, emasculated, covered in boiling lead sulfite, then decapitated, dragged through the streets, and hanged on the gallows, decaying over weeks.

== Family ==
Philip was the younger son of Walter V of Aunay (who died after 1318/c. 1325), who was lord of Moussy-le-Neuf and of Grand-Moulin. His two brothers were Walter of Aunay (also known as Gautier) and Walter of Aunay the Young, lord of Savigny who had two sons: Reginald and Perceval of Aunay.

Philip was married to Agnes of Montmorency, granddaughter of Matthew III of Montmorency:

- Philip II "the Welsh" (d. before 1392), lord of Grand-Moulin and of Villeron, butler of the Kings Charles V and Charles VI, of Charles I of Montmorency and of John, count of Poitiers. He was governor of the city of Meaux. He left several legitimate children: Joanne, Margaret and Robert (about 1365 to 1414), and two legitimized children: John the Bastard of Aunay and Joanne of Aunay the Young;
- Peter, captain of the city of Meaux
- John of Aunay "the Welsh"
- Margaret of Aunay

== Fiction ==
- In Tower of Lust, directed by Abel Gance, the character of Philipp is played by Jacques Toja.
- In Les Rois maudits (The Cursed Kings) (TV, 1972) by Claude Barma, he is played by Patrick Lancelot.
- In Les Rois maudits (TV, 2005), by Josée Dayan, he is played by Silvio Otteanu.
