= List of French royal consorts =

Spouses of French monarchs

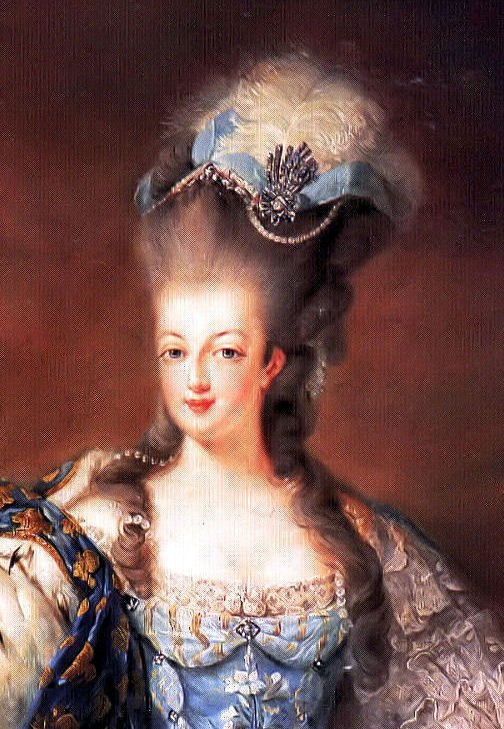
Queen Marie Antoinette, wife of King Louis XVI, was beheaded during the French Revolution.

This is a list of the women who were queens or empresses as wives of French monarchs from the 843 Treaty of Verdun, which gave rise to West Francia, until 1870, when the French Third Republic was declared.

Living wives of reigning monarchs technically became queen consorts, including Margaret of Burgundy and Blanche of Burgundy who were kept in prison during their whole queenships.

== Pre-Capetian queens (751–987) ==
Picture	Name	Father	Birth	Marriage	Became queen	Coronation	Ceased to be queen	Death	Spouse	
	Ermentrude of Orléans	Odo, Count of Orléans	823	842			869		Charles the Bald	
	Richilde of Provence	Bivin of Gorze	c. 845	870			5/6 October 877	2 June 910	Charles the Bald	
	Adelaide of Paris	Adalard of Paris	c. 850–853	February 875	5/6 October 877		10 April 879	10 November 901	Louis the Stammerer	
	Théodrate of Troyes	unknown	868	before 885	February 888		1 January 898	903	Odo	
	Frederuna	Dietrich of Ringelheim	887	907			917		Charles the Simple	
	Eadgifu of Wessex	Edward the Elder	902	7 October 919			922	after 955	Charles the Simple	
	Beatrice of Vermandois	Herbert I, Count of Vermandois	c. 880	895	922		923	after 931	Robert I	
	Emma of France	Robert I of France	894	921	13 July 923	later in 923	934		Rudolph	
	Gerberga of Saxony	Henry I of Germany	c. 913	939			10 September 954	5 May 984	Louis IV	
	Emma of Italy	Lothair II of Italy	c. 948	965			26 March 986	?	Lothair	
Picture	Name	Father	Birth	Marriage	Became queen	Coronation	Ceased to be queen	Death	Spouse	Arms

== Direct Capetians (987-1328) ==
Picture	Name	Father	Birth	Marriage	Became queen	Coronation	Ceased to be queen	Death	Spouse	
	Adelaide of Aquitaine	William III, Duke of Aquitaine	c. 945	970	3 July 987		24 October 996	1004	Hugh	
	Rozala of Italy	Berengar II of Italy	c. 937	988/989	996		996	7 February 1003	Robert II	
	Bertha of Burgundy	Conrad I of Burgundy	c. 952	996			1000	1035?	Robert II	
	Constance of Provence	William I, Count of Provence	986	1003			20 July 1031	25 July 1034	Robert II	
	Matilda of Frisia	Liudolf, Margrave of Frisia	c. 1024	1034			1044		Henry I	
	Anne of Kiev	Yaroslav I, Grand Prince of Kiev	c. 1024	19 May 1051			4 August 1060	1075	Henry I	
	Bertha of Holland	Floris I, Count of Holland	c. 1055	1072			1092	1094	Philip I	
	Bertrade de Montfort	Simon I de Montfort	c. 1070	15 May 1092			29 July 1108	1117	Philip I	
	Adelaide of Maurienne	Humbert II, Count of Savoy	1092	3 August 1115			1 August 1137	18 November 1154	Louis VI	
	Eleanor, Duchess of Aquitaine	William X, Duke of Aquitaine	1122	22 July 1137	1 August 1137	25 December 1137	21 March 1152 annulment	1 April 1204	Louis VII	
	Constance of Castile	Alfonso VII of León and Castile	1141	1154		1154	1160		Louis VII	
	Adela of Champagne	Theobald II, Count of Champagne	c. 1140	13 November 1160			18 September 1180	4 June 1206	Louis VII	
	Isabella of Hainault	Baldwin V, Count of Hainaut	5 April 1170	1180		29 May 1180	1190		Philip II	
	Ingeborg of Denmark	Valdemar I of Denmark	1175	15 August 1193		25 August 1193	5 November 1193 separated	29 July 1236	Philip II	
	Agnes of Merania	Berthold IV, Duke of Merania	about 1175	June 1196		?	1200 repudiated	20 July 1201	Philip II	
	Ingeborg of Denmark	Valdemar I of Denmark	1175	15 August 1193	1200 restored		14 July 1223 husband's death	29 July 1236	Philip II	
	Blanche of Castile	Alfonso VIII of Castile	4 March 1188	22 May 1200	14 July 1223	6 August 1223	8 November 1226	26 November 1252	Louis VIII	
	Margaret of Provence	Ramon Berenguer IV, Count of Provence	c. 1221	27 May 1234		28 May 1234	25 August 1270	21 December 1295	Louis IX	
	Isabella of Aragon	James I of Aragon	1247	28 May 1262	25 August 1270	Not crowned	28 January 1271		Philip III	
	Maria of Brabant	Henry III, Duke of Brabant	1254	21 August 1274		24 June 1275	5 October 1285	10 January 1322	Philip III	
	Joan I of Navarre	Henry I of Navarre	14 January 1273	16 August 1284	5 October 1285	5 January 1286	4 April 1305		Philip IV	
	Margaret of Burgundy	Robert II, Duke of Burgundy	1290	23 September 1305	29 November 1314	not crowned	15 August 1315		Louis X	
	Clementia of Hungary	Charles Martel of Anjou	1293	19 August 1315		24 August 1315	5 June 1316	12 October 1328	Louis X	
	Joan II, Countess of Burgundy	Otto IV, Count of Burgundy	1291	1307	20 November 1316	9 January 1317	3 January 1322	21 January 1330	Philip V	
	Blanche of Burgundy	Otto IV, Count of Burgundy	c. 1296	1308	3 January 1322	not crowned	19 May 1322	April 1326	Charles IV	
	Marie of Luxembourg	Henry VII, Holy Roman Emperor	1304	21 September 1322		15 May 1323	26 March 1324		Charles IV	
	Jeanne d'Évreux	Louis, Count of Évreux	1310	5 July 1325		11 May 1326	1 February 1328 husband's death	4 March 1371	Charles IV	
Picture	Name	Father	Birth	Marriage	Became queen	Coronation	Ceased to be queen	Death	Spouse	Arms

== House of Valois (1328-1589) ==
Picture	Name	Father	Birth	Marriage	Became queen	Coronation	Ceased to be queen	Death	Spouse	Arms
	Joan the Lame	Robert II, Duke of Burgundy	24 June 1293	July 1313	1 April 1328	29 May 1328	12 September 1348		Philip VI	
	Blanche of Navarre	Philip III of Navarre	1330–1333	29 January 1350		not crowned	22 August 1350 husband's death	5 October 1398	Philip VI	
	Joanna I of Auvergne	William XII, Count of Auvergne	8 May 1326	13 February 1349	22 August 1350	26 September 1350	29 September 1360		John II	
	Joanna of Bourbon	Peter I, Duke of Bourbon	3 February 1338	April 1350	8 April 1364	19 May 1364	6 February 1378		Charles V	
	Isabeau of Bavaria	Stephen III, Duke of Bavaria	c. 1370	17 July 1385		23 August 1389	21 October 1422 husband's death	24 September 1435	Charles VI	
	Marie of Anjou	Louis II of Naples	14 October 1404	18 December 1422		?	22 July 1461 husband's death	29 November 1463	Charles VII	
	Charlotte of Savoy	Louis, Duke of Savoy	16 November 1441	14 February 1451	22 July 1461	?	30 August 1483 husband's death	1 December 1483	Louis XI	
	Anne of Brittany	Francis II, Duke of Brittany	25 January 1477	6 December 1491		8 February 1492	7 April 1498 husband's death	9 January 1514	Charles VIII	
	Joan of Valois	Louis XI of France	23 April 1464	8 September 1476	7 April 1498 husband's ascension	Not crowned	17 December 1498 annulment	4 February 1505	Louis XII	
	Anne of Brittany	Francis II, Duke of Brittany	25 January 1477	8 January 1499		18 November 1504	9 January 1514		Louis XII	
	Mary of England	Henry VII of England	18 March 1496	13 August 1514 (by proxy); 9 October 1514		5 November 1514	1 January 1515 husband's death	25 June 1533	Louis XII	
	Claude of France	Louis XII of France	14 October 1499	18 May 1514	1 January 1515 husband's ascension	10 May 1517	20 July 1524		Francis I	
	Eleanor of Austria	Philip I of Castile	15 November 1498	4 July 1530		5 March 1532	31 March 1547 husband's death	25 February 1558	Francis I	
	Catherine de' Medici	Lorenzo II de' Medici, Duke of Urbino	13 April 1519	28 October 1533	31 March 1547 husband's ascension	10 June 1549	10 July 1559 husband's death	5 January 1589	Henry II	
	Mary, Queen of Scots	James V	8 December 1542	24 April 1558	10 July 1559 husband's ascension	Not crowned as queen of France	5 December 1560 husband's death	8 February 1587	Francis II	
	Elisabeth of Austria	Maximilian II, Holy Roman Emperor	5 June 1554	26 November 1570		25 March 1571	30 May 1574 husband's death	22 January 1592	Charles IX	
	Louise of Lorraine	Nicholas, Duke of Mercœur	30 April 1553	13 February 1575		Not crowned	2 August 1589 husband's death	29 January 1601	Henry III	
Picture	Name	Father	Birth	Marriage	Became queen	Coronation	Ceased to be queen	Death	Spouse	Arms

== House of Lancaster (disputed) ==
Some sources refer to Margaret of Anjou as Queen of France, but her right to enjoy that title is disputed. She was briefly recognized only in English-controlled territories of France. (See also: Dual monarchy of England and France)

Picture	Name	Father	Birth	Marriage	Became queen	Coronation	Ceased to be queen	Death	Spouse	Arms
	Margaret of Anjou	René of Naples	23 March 1430	23 April 1445		not crowned as Queen of France	19 October 1453 defeat of the English in the Hundred Years' War	25 August 1482	Henry (II)	
Picture	Name	Father	Birth	Marriage	Became queen	Coronation	Ceased to be queen	Death	Spouse	Arms

== House of Bourbon (1589–1792) ==
Picture	Name	Father	Birth	Marriage	Became queen	Coronation	Ceased to be queen	Death	Spouse	Arms
	Margaret of Valois	Henry II of France	14 May 1553	18 August 1572	2 August 1589 husband's accession	Not crowned	17 December 1599 marriage annulled	27 March 1615	Henry IV	
	Marie de' Medici	Francesco I de' Medici, Grand Duke of Tuscany	26 April 1575	17 December 1600		13 May 1610	14 May 1610 husband's death	3 July 1642	Henry IV	
	Anne of Austria	Philip III of Spain	22 September 1601	18 October 1615 (by proxy); 24 November 1615		Not crowned	14 May 1643 husband's death	20 January 1666	Louis XIII	
	Maria Theresa of Spain	Philip IV of Spain	10 September 1638	3 June 1660 (by proxy); 9 June 1660		Not crowned	30 July 1683		Louis XIV	
	Marie Leszczyńska	Stanisław Leszczyński	23 June 1703	4 September 1725		Not crowned	24 June 1768		Louis XV	
	Marie Antoinette	Francis I, Holy Roman Emperor	2 November 1755	19 April 1770	10 May 1774 husband's ascension	Not crowned	21 September 1792 husband's deposition	16 October 1793	Louis XVI	
Picture	Name	Father	Birth	Marriage	Became queen	Coronation	Ceased to be queen	Death	Spouse	Arms

Françoise d'Aubigné, Marquise de Maintenon, who secretly married Louis XIV in 1683, was never publicly acknowledged as his wife.

Louis XVIII became "titular" King in 1795 (when in exile in Italy, later in Russia, Germany and Great Britain) and his wife Marie Josephine of Savoy became the (titular) Queen until her death in 1810.

== Bonaparte dynasty (1804–1815) ==
Picture	Name	Father	Birth	Marriage	Became empress	Coronation	Ceased to be empress	Death	Spouse	Arms
	Joséphine de Beauharnais	Joseph-Gaspard de Tascher de La Pagerie	23 June 1763	9 March 1796	18 May 1804 husband's ascension	2 December 1804	10 January 1810 divorce	29 May 1814	Napoleon I	
	Marie Louise of Austria	Francis II, Holy Roman Emperor	12 December 1791	11 March 1810 (by proxy); 1 April 1810		Not crowned	6 April 1814 husband's abdication	17 December 1847	Napoleon I	
Picture	Name	Father	Birth	Marriage	Became empress	Coronation	Ceased to be empress	Death	Spouse	Arms

== House of Bourbon (1815-1848) ==
Picture	Name	Father	Birth	Marriage	Became queen	Coronation	Ceased to be queen	Death	Spouse	Arms
	Marie Thérèse of France	Louis XVI	19 December 1778	10 June 1799	2 August 1830 for 20 minutes	Not crowned	2 August 1830 husband's abdication	19 October 1851	Louis XIX	
	Maria Amalia of Naples and Sicily	Ferdinand I of the Two Sicilies	26 April 1782	25 November 1809	9 August 1830 husband's ascension	Not crowned	24 February 1848 husband's abdication	24 March 1866	Louis-Philippe	

== Bonaparte dynasty (1852–1870) ==
Picture	Name	Father	Birth	Marriage	Became empress	Coronation	Ceased to be empress	Death	Spouse	Arms
	Eugénie de Montijo	Cipriano de Palafox y Portocarrero, Count of Montijo	5 May 1826	30 January 1853		Not crowned	4 September 1870 husband's deposition	11 July 1920	Napoleon III	

== See also ==
- Family tree of French monarchs
- List of French monarchs
