= La Tour de Nesle =

Play by Dumas and Gaillardet

La Tour de Nesle is a drama in five acts and nine tableaux, based on the circumstances of the Tour de Nesle Affair. It was written by Frédéric Gaillardet, then rewritten by Alexandre Dumas. It premiered at Théâtre de la Porte-Saint-Martin on 29 May 1832.

== Plot ==
La Tour de Nesle relates the story of Margaret of Burgundy, Queen of France, who, after restless nights, killed her partners to leave no witness of her nocturnal debauchery.

== Bibliography ==
- Alexandre Dumas, Frédéric Gaillardet, La Tour de Nesle, drame en cinq actes et en neuf tableaux, Paris, Imprimerie normale de J. Didot l'aîné, 1832 OCLC 14401227.
