= Les Andelys =

- Subprefecture and commune
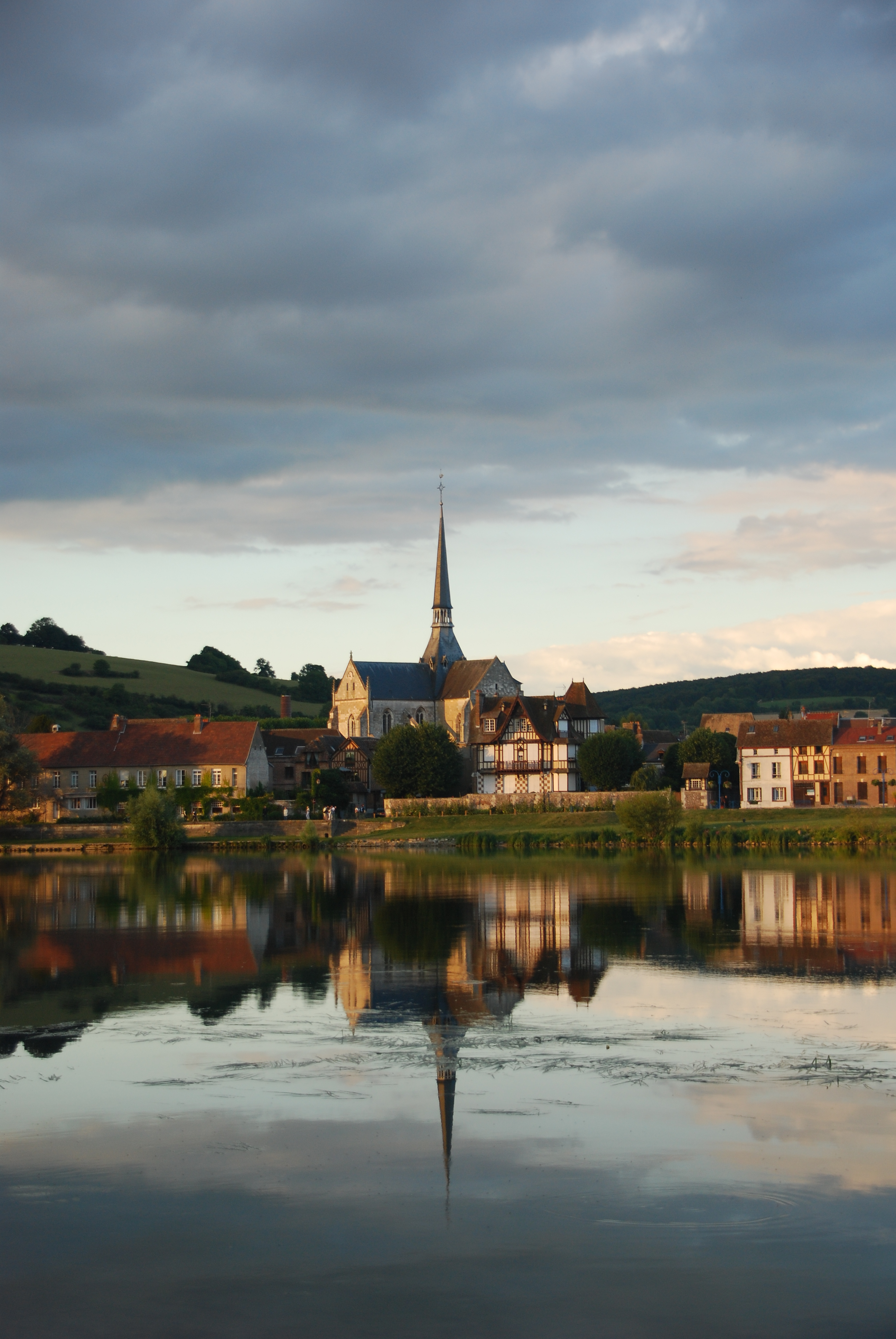
- The church and surroundings in Les Andelys

- Coat of arms
- Location of Les Andelys
- Location within France Location within Normandy
- Coordinates: 49°14′46″N 1°24′45″E
- Country: France
- Region: Normandy
- Department: Eure
- Arrondissement: Les Andelys
- Canton: Les Andelys
- Intercommunality: Seine Normandie Agglomération

Government
  - Mayor (2020–2026): Frédéric Duché
- Area^{1}: 40.62 km^{2} (15.68 sq mi)
- Elevation: 23 m (75 ft)
- Highest elevation: 161 m (528 ft)
- Lowest elevation: 7 m (23 ft)
- Population (2023): 7,706
  - Density: 189.7/km^{2} (491.3/sq mi)
- Time zone: UTC+01:00 (CET)
  - Summer (DST): UTC+02:00 (CEST)
- INSEE/Postal code: 27016 /27700
- ^{1} French Land Register data, which excludes lakes, ponds, glaciers > 1 km^{2} (0.386 sq mi or 247 acres) and river estuaries.

Les Andelys (French pronunciation: [lez‿ɑ̃dli]; Norman: Les Aundelys) is a commune in the northern French department of Eure, in Normandy.

== Geography ==
It lies on the Seine, about 35 km (22 mi) northeast of Évreux.

The commune is divided into two parts, Grand-Andely (located about .8 kilometres (0.5 mi) from the Seine) and Petit-Andely (situated on the right bank of the Seine).

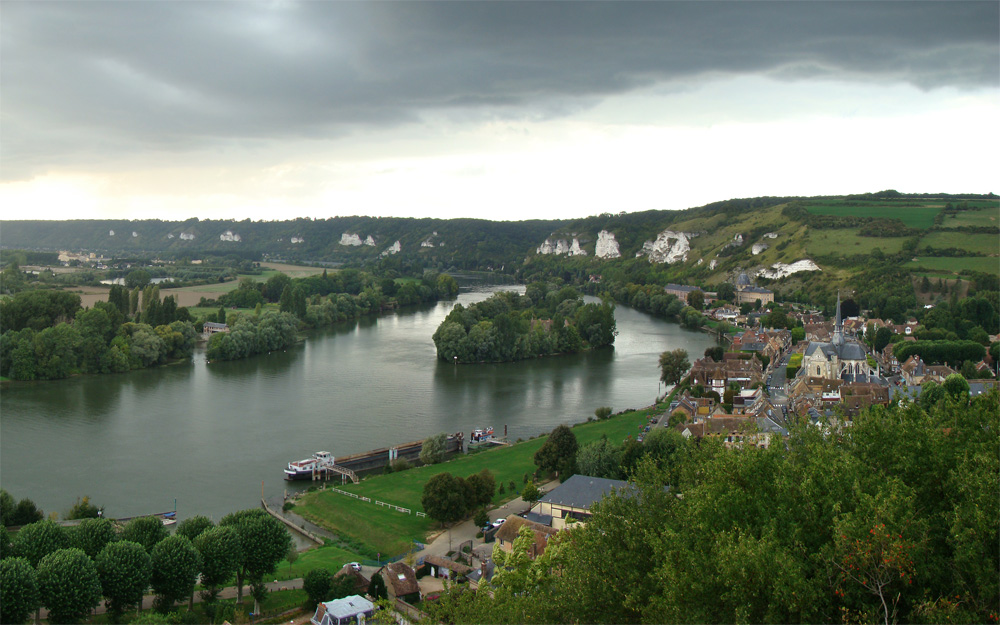
Panorama from the belvedere of Château Gaillard

== History ==
Grand Andely, founded, according to tradition, in the 6th century, has a church (13th, 14th and 15th centuries) parts of which are of fine late Gothic and Renaissance architecture. The works of art in the interior include stained glass of the latter period. Other interesting buildings are the hôtel du Grand Cerf dating from the first half of the 16th century, and the chapel of Sainte-Clotilde, close by a spring which, owing to its supposed healing powers, is the object of a pilgrimage. Grand Andely has a statue of Nicolas Poussin, a native of the place. Petit Andely sprang up at the foot of the eminence on which stands the Château Gaillard, now in ruins, but formerly one of the strongest fortresses in France. It was built by Richard I of England at the end of the 12th century to protect the Norman frontier, was captured by the French in 1204 and passed finally into their possession in 1449. The church of St Sauveur at Petit Andely also dates from the end of the 12th century.

== Population ==
Historical population

Year	Pop.	±% p.a.
1793	5,140	—
1800	5,160	+0.06%
1806	5,048	−0.37%
1821	5,016	−0.04%
1831	5,168	+0.30%
1836	5,085	−0.32%
1841	5,345	+1.00%
1846	5,000	−1.33%
1851	5,161	+0.64%
1856	5,026	−0.53%
1861	5,137	+0.44%
1866	5,161	+0.09%
1872	5,379	+0.69%
1876	5,574	+0.89%
1881	5,474	−0.36%
1886	5,423	−0.19%
1891	6,040	+2.18%
1896	5,923	−0.39%
1901	5,715	−0.71%

Year	Pop.	±% p.a.
1906	5,514	−0.71%
1911	5,530	+0.06%
1921	5,237	−0.54%
1926	5,396	+0.60%
1931	5,366	−0.11%
1936	5,529	+0.60%
1946	5,238	−0.54%
1954	5,648	+0.95%
1962	6,090	+0.95%
1968	7,053	+2.48%
1975	8,196	+2.17%
1982	8,124	−0.13%
1990	8,455	+0.50%
1999	9,047	+0.75%
2007	8,208	−1.21%
2012	8,179	−0.07%
2017	8,056	−0.30%
2023	7,706	−0.74%

Source: EHESS and INSEE (1968-2023)

== Sights ==
- Château Gaillard, a medieval castle, is located in Les Andelys.
- 13th-17th century Church of Our Lady, Grand-Andely
- 13th century Church of Saint-Sauveur, Petit-Andely
- Sainte Clotilde Miraculous Spring
- The Seine Banks
- The half-timbered houses of Petit Andely

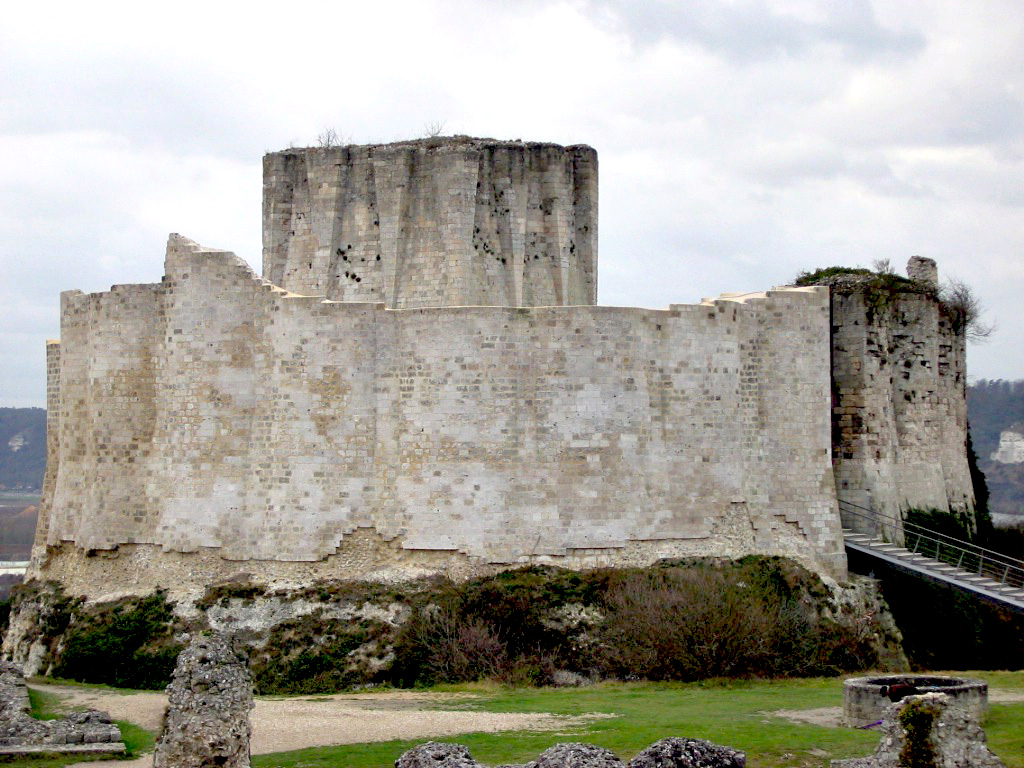
Château Gaillard, Donjon

Our Lady's Church

== Notable people ==
Les Andelys was the birthplace of:

- Adrianus Turnebus (1512–1565), classical scholar.
- Nicolas Poussin (1594–1665), painter.
- Jean-Pierre Blanchard (1753–1809), balloonist, first man to cross the English Channel by air
- Charles Joshua Chaplin (1825–1891), painter
- Henry Torrès (1891–1966), trial lawyer, politician, and writer
- Sir John Woodroffe (1865–1936), lawyer and writer on Indian philosophy and Tantra, lived there from 1920 until his death.

== See also ==
- Communes of the Eure department
- Treaty of Louviers
