= Treaty of Louviers =

The Treaty of Louviers was signed in January 1196 by Philip II of France and Richard I of England between Issoudun and Chârost, when Richard appeared after riding over 150 miles (240 km) in three days. Philip asked permission for his army to leave, and when Richard refused they talked terms. The two kings met between the lines and had private words. They then dismounted, removed their helmets and exchanged a kiss of peace.

Philip gave back the territory recently gained from Richard in return for the Vexin, and Alays of France who had been betrothed to Richard in 1169 when she was 8 years old was returned to Philip. She was now 34, an age when most women of the time were dead; Philip married her off to Count William of Ponthieu.

The treaty confirmed the Treaty of Issoudon signed by Richard and Philip in December 1195, and showed that in the struggle for northern France Richard had all the advantages. While the French thought that he had abandoned his claim to the Norman Vexin, for Richard he was just buying time until the peace was to be renewed in June.

Both kings had a common rallying-point in their joint dislike of the Archbishop of Rouen, but the “peace of Louviers” was shaky when Philip changed tack, issuing afeconducts to the Archbishop etc. Then Richard invaded Brittany and “swept all before him” in Easter week 1196.

The treaty was "made to be broken", as it clearly stated that "Andeley shall not be fortified", but Richard constructed Château Gaillard on the Rock of Andeley in 1197, although it was captured after Richard's death by Philip in 1204 after a siege.

It was a temporary winter truce in their rivalry. The conflict between the Plantagenet kings of England and the Capetian kings of France lasted from 1159 to 1259 in the 12th and 13th centuries; see Capetian-Plantagenet rivalry.
