= Blanche of Burgundy =

Queen of France and Navarre in 1322

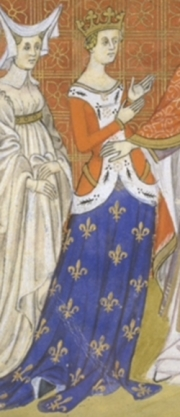

Queen consort of France and Navarre
- Tenure: 3 January 1322 – 19 May 1322
- Born: c. 1296
- Died: c. 1326 (aged c. 30)
- Spouse: Charles IV of France (m. 1308; ann. 1322)
- Issue: Philip of France; Joan of France
- House: Ivrea
- Father: Otto IV of Burgundy
- Mother: Mahaut of Artois

Blanche of Burgundy (c. 1296 – c. 1326) was Queen of France and Navarre for a few months in 1322 as the wife of King Charles IV. The daughter of Count Otto IV of Burgundy and Countess Mahaut of Artois, she was led to a disastrous marriage by her mother's ambition. Eight years before her husband's accession to the thrones, Blanche was arrested and found guilty of adultery with a Norman knight. Her sister-in-law, Margaret of Burgundy, suffered the same fate, while her sister Joan was acquitted. Blanche was imprisoned and not released even after becoming queen, until her marriage was annulled when she was moved to the coast of Normandy. The date and place of her death are unknown; the mere fact that she died was simply mentioned on the occasion of her husband's third marriage in April 1326.

== Early life ==
Blanche was the younger daughter of Otto IV, Count of Burgundy, and Mahaut, Countess of Artois. Her father died in 1303, leaving the county to Blanche's elder sister, Joan. Joan was supposed to marry Louis, the heir of Philip IV of France, but Philip changed his mind and arranged for her to marry his second son, Philip, in 1307. The Countess of Artois was proud of this achievement and quickly started negotiating her younger daughter's marriage to Charles, King Philip's third son, offering a huge dowry. The negotiations were successful and on 23 September 1307, the eleven-year-old Blanche and thirteen-year-old Charles concluded a marriage contract. The marriage ceremony was hastily performed at Countess Mahaut's castle in Hesdin in January 1308.

== Adultery accusations ==
In 1313, Blanche's sister-in-law and brother-in-law, Isabella and Edward II of England, visited King Philip IV. Isabella presented her brothers and sisters-in-law with embroidered coin purses. Later that year, upon their return to London, Isabella and Edward held a banquet during which Isabella noticed that the coin purses she had given to Blanche and Margaret were now in the possession of the Norman knights Gautier and Philippe d'Aunay. From that she concluded that the brothers were having relationships with her sisters-in-law. When she visited Paris again in 1314, she informed King Philip about her suspicions. Blanche's sister Joan was accused of hiding the affair and later of participating in it.

=== Trial and imprisonment ===
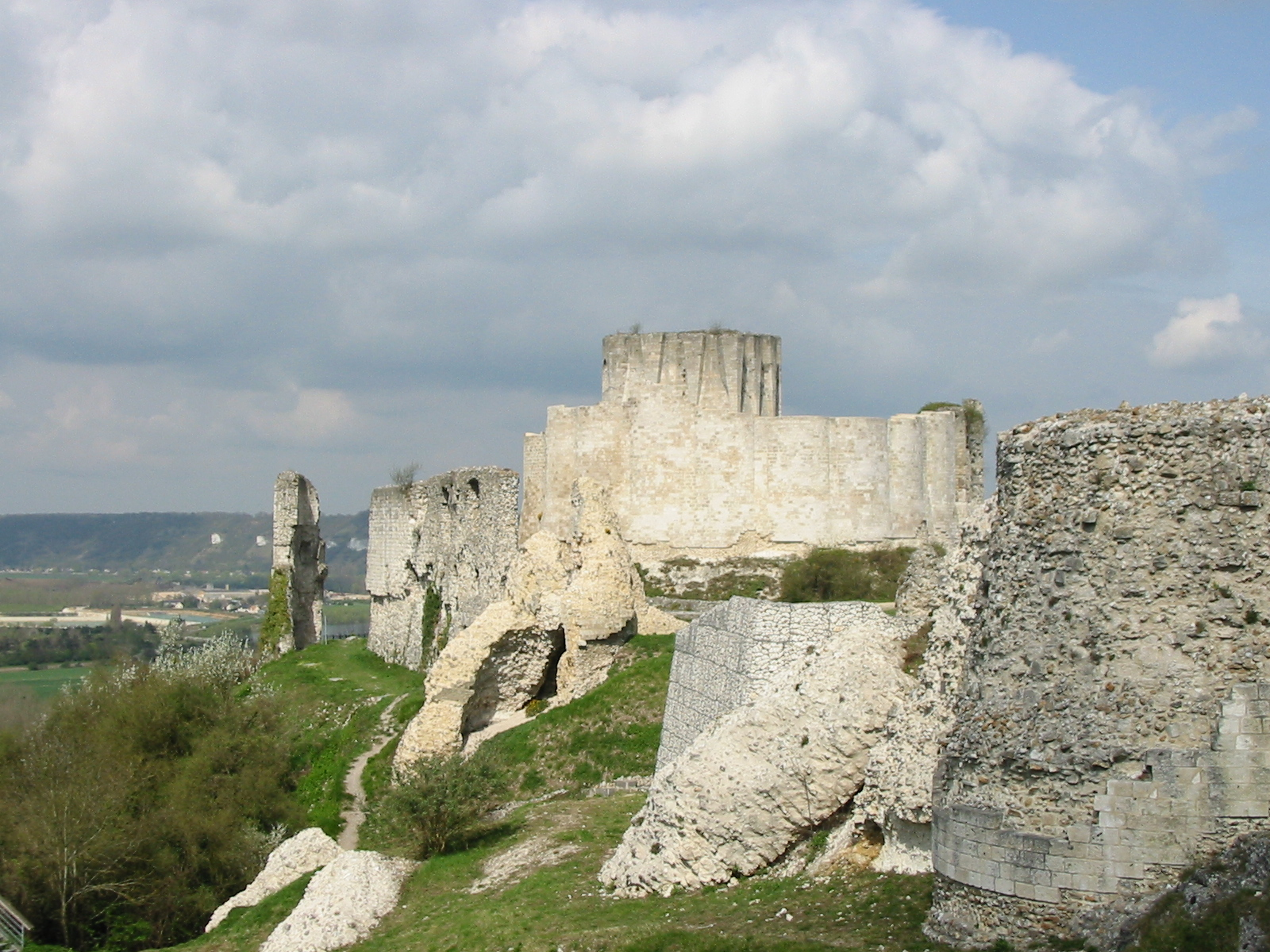
The ruins of Château Gaillard.

Acting quickly, King Philip ordered the arrest of all his daughters-in-law and the knights. Following torture, the d'Aunays confessed to adultery and admitted that it had lasted three years. Blanche and Margaret were tried before the Paris Parlement and were found guilty of adultery. Their heads were shaven and both were sentenced to life imprisonment underground in Château Gaillard, while the d'Aunays were condemned to death and duly executed. Blanche's first child, a son named Philip, was born around 5 January 1314, so presumably his paternity was not challenged; her second child, a daughter named Joan, was born in 1315 after the trial. Despite her disgrace, Blanche remained in contact with her ambitious mother and often received gifts from her.

== Queenship and death ==
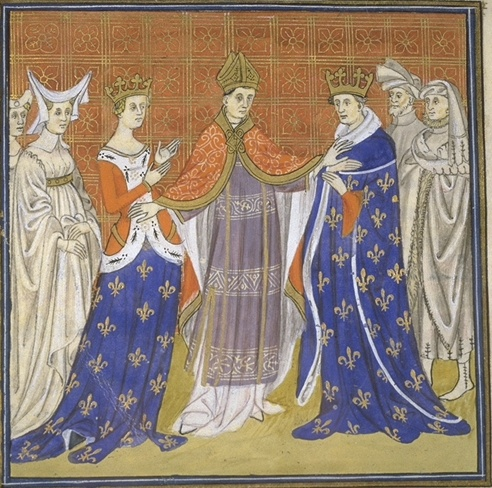
Pope John XXII annulling the marriage of Charles the Fair and Blanche of Burgundy

On Philip V's death on 3 January 1322, Blanche's husband, Charles, inherited the crown. Blanche thus became queen of France and Navarre, but she remained imprisoned and not crowned; at Charles' request, Pope John XXII declared their marriage null and void on 19 May 1322. Both Charles and Blanche received permission to remarry. Both of her children died in infancy, Philip by the end of March 1322 and Joan on 17 May 1321.

Though she was replaced immediately by Marie of Luxembourg, there was no hope for Blanche to remarry, as she was sent to Gavray Castle. There is no evidence that supports the common belief that she died as a nun at Maubuisson Abbey. Having spent eight years imprisoned underground, the former queen had poor health. The date of her eventual death is unknown; the Pope mentioned her as dead in a document of 5 April 1326 issuing a dispensation for the marriage of her former husband and Jeanne d'Évreux.

== In fiction ==
Blanche is a character in Les Rois maudits (The Accursed Kings), a series of French historical novels by Maurice Druon. She was portrayed by Catherine Hubeau in the 1972 French miniseries adaptation of the series, and by Anne Malraux in the 2005 adaptation.

== Family tree ==
Philip IV of France	Otto	Mahaut
Edward II	Isabella	Margaret	Louis X of France	Philip V of France	Joan	Charles IV of France	Blanche

== Sources ==
- Bradbury, Jim (2007). The Capetians: The History of a Dynasty. Continuum International Publishing Group. ISBN 978-0826435149.
- Brown, Elizabeth A.R. (2000). "The King's Conundrum: Endowing Queens and Loyal Servants, Ensuring Salvation, and Protecting the Patrimony in Fourteenth-Century France". In Burrow, J.A.; Wei, Ian P. (eds.). Medieval Futures: Attitudes to the Future in the Middle Ages. Boydell & Brewer. pp. 115–166. ISBN 0851157793.
- Brown, Elizabeth A.R. (2007). ""Laver de ses pechiés une pecheresse royale": Psalm Collects in an Early Fourteenth-Century Devotional Book". In Doss-Quinby, Eglal; Krueger, Roberta L.; Burns, E. Jane (eds.). Cultural Performances in Medieval France: Essays in Honor of Nancy Freeman Regalado. DS Brewer. pp. 163–180. ISBN 978-1843841128.
- Brown, Elizabeth A.R. (2009). "Blanche of Artois and Burgundy, Chateau-Gaillard, and the Baron de Joursanvault". In Smith, Katherine Allen; Wells, Scott (eds.). Negotiating community and difference in medieval Europe: gender, power, patronage, and the authority of religion in Latin Christendom. BRILL.
- Gaude-Ferragu, Murielle (2016). Queenship in Medieval France, 1300-1500. Translated by Krieger, Angela. Palgrave Macmillan.
- Georgiou, Constantinos (2018). Preaching the Crusades to the Eastern Mediterranean: Propaganda, Liturgy and Diplomacy, 1305–1352. Routledge.
- Warner, Kathryn (2016). Isabella of France: The Rebel Queen. Amberley Publishing.

Blanche of Burgundy House of Ivrea Born: c. 1296 Died: c. 1326
Royal titles
Preceded by Joan II of Burgundy	Queen consort of France and Navarre; 1322	Vacant Title next held by Marie of Luxembourg
