= Tour de Nesle affair =

Speculated adultery in the French royal family

Coordinates: 48°51′27″N 2°20′14″E

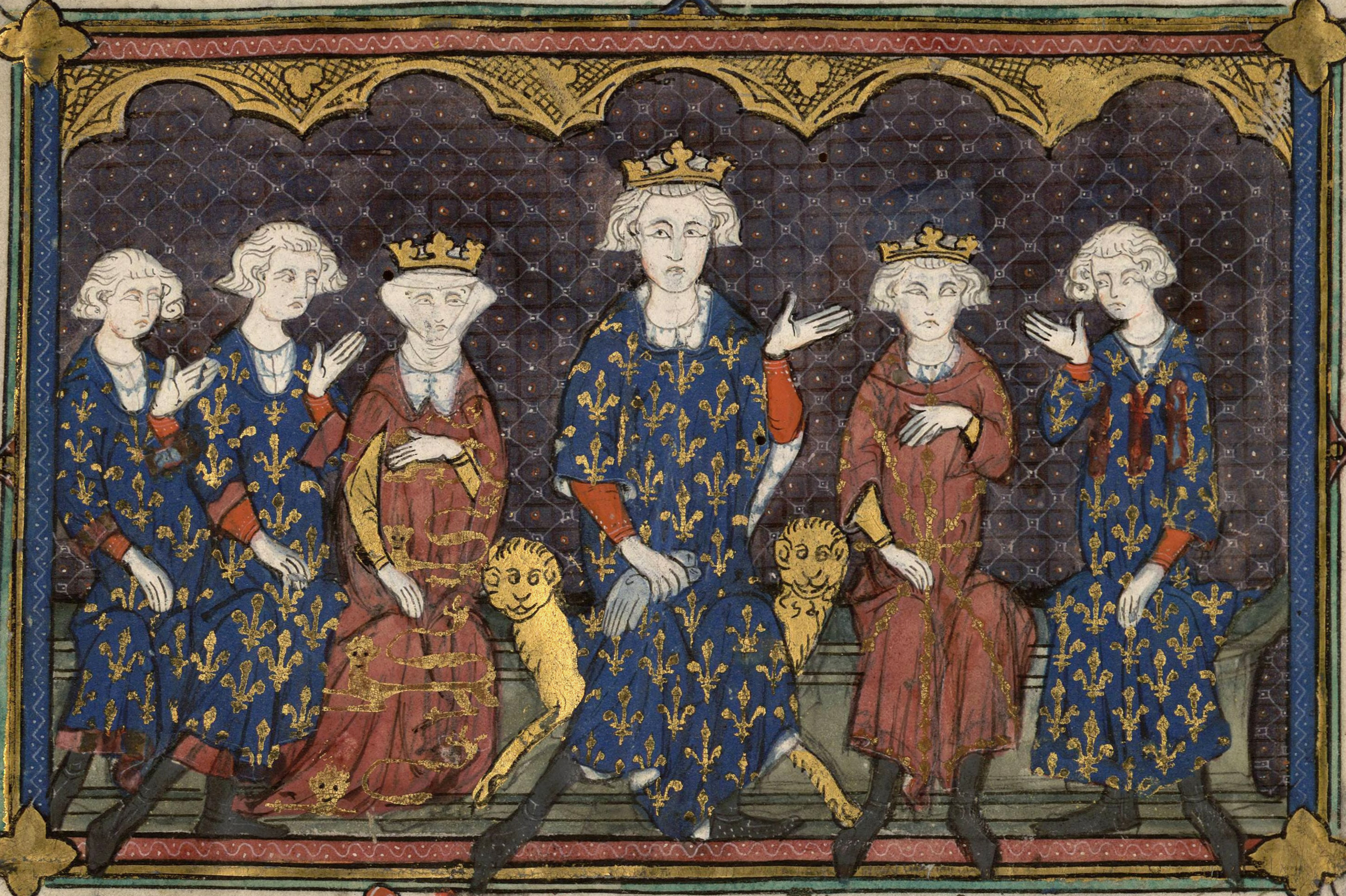
Some of the principal actors in the Tour de Nesle Affair, depicted in 1315, the year after the scandal broke: Philip IV of France (centre) and his family: l–r: his sons, Charles and Philip, his daughter Isabella, himself, his eldest son and heir Louis, and his brother, Charles of Valois.

The Tour de Nesle affair was a scandal amongst the French royal family in 1314, during which Margaret, Blanche, and Joan, the daughters-in-law of King Philip IV, were accused of adultery. The accusations were apparently started by Philip's daughter, Isabella. The Tour de Nesle was a tower in Paris where much of the adultery was said to have occurred. The scandal led to imprisonments, torture and executions for the princesses' lovers and the imprisonment of the princesses, with lasting consequences for the final years of the House of Capet.

== Background ==
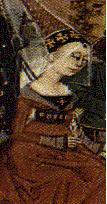
Queen Isabella of England first reported the rumours of adultery by her sisters-in-law to her father in Paris

The royal scandal occurred at the end of the difficult reign of Philip IV, known as "le Bel" (the Fair) because of his good looks. Philip IV was said to be an unemotional man. The contemporary bishop of Pamiers described him as "neither a man nor a beast, but a statue"; modern historians have noted that he "cultivated a reputation for Christian kingship and showed few weaknesses of the flesh." Throughout his reign, Philip had attempted to build up the authority and prestige of the French crown, raising fresh revenues, creating new institutions of government, engaging in wars against his rivals, and on occasion challenging the authority of the Church. Just before the crisis broke, Philip had been engaged in the liquidation of the order of the Knights Templar in France. By 1314, however, he was financially overstretched and in an increasingly difficult domestic political situation, and some have suggested that his weakened position contributed to the subsequent royal crisis.

Philip IV had three surviving sons, Louis, Philip and Charles. As was customary for the period, all three were married with an eye for political gain. Initially, Philip had intended Louis to marry Joan, the eldest daughter of Otto IV, Count of Burgundy, but in the end chose Margaret, the daughter of Robert II, Duke of Burgundy, in 1305, and arranged for his middle son Philip to marry Joan in 1307. His youngest son Charles married Blanche, another of Otto's daughters, in 1308.

The three marriages had fared differently. Louis' is considered to have been an unhappy match; Louis, known as "the Quarreler" and "the Headstrong", is said to have preferred playing real tennis to spending time with the "feisty and shapely" Margaret. Charles, a relatively conservative, "strait-laced" and "stiff-necked" individual, had an unexceptional marriage. Philip, in contrast, became noted for his unusual generosity to his wife Joan; the pair had a considerable number of children in a short space of time and Philip wrote numerous, if formulaic, love letters to his wife over the years.

Meanwhile, Philip the Fair married his daughter, Isabella, to Edward II of England in 1308 in an attempt to resolve the tensions of his twin problems of conflict over the contested territories of Gascony and Flanders. Isabella's marriage proved difficult, largely due to Edward's intimate relationship with his close friend and possible lover, Piers Gaveston. Isabella looked frequently to her father for help addressing the problems in her English marriage.

== The scandal ==
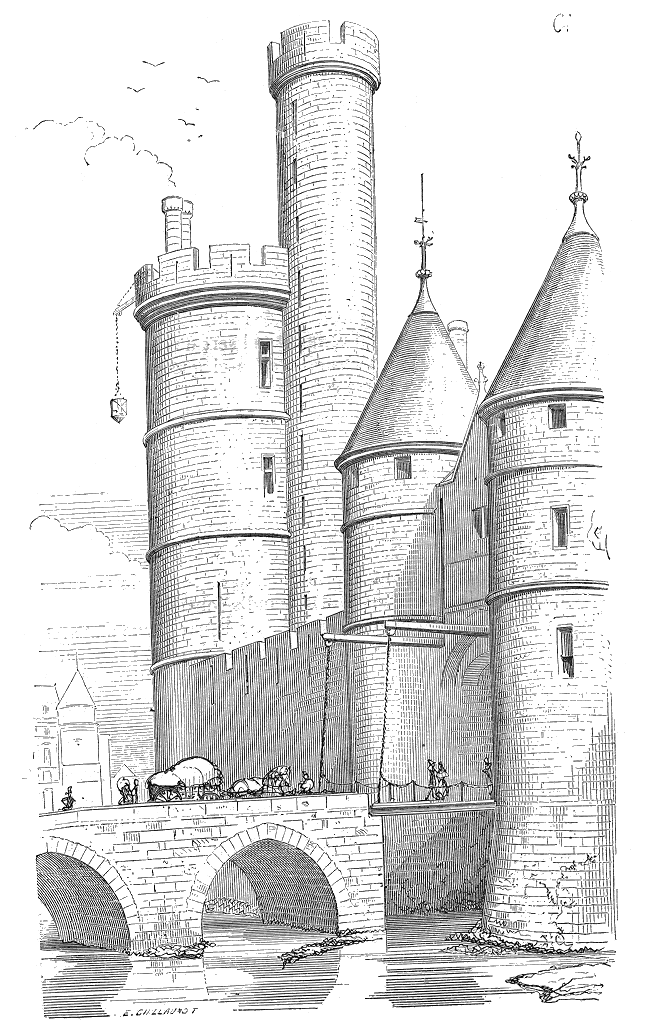
A 19th-century representation of the Tour de Nesle, where much of the adulterous activity was alleged to have occurred, by Eugène Viollet-le-Duc

Most accounts of the scandal begin with the visit of the king and queen of England to the queen's father in France during 1313. During the visit, Louis and Charles had a satirical puppet show put on for their guests, and after this Isabella had given new embroidered purses both to her brothers and to their wives. Later in the year, Isabella and Edward held a large dinner in London to celebrate their return and Isabella apparently noticed that the purses she had given to her sisters-in-law were now being carried by two Norman knights, Walter of Aunay (also known as Gautier of Aunay) and Philip of Aunay. Isabella concluded that the pair must have been carrying on an illicit affair, and appears to have informed her father of this during her next visit to France in 1314.

Philip IV placed the knights under surveillance for a period, and the scandal began to take shape. The accusations centred on suggestions that Blanche and Margaret had been drinking, eating and engaging in adultery with Gautier and Philip of Aunay in the Tour de Nesle over a period. The Tour de Nesle was an old guard tower in Paris next to the river Seine and had been bought by Philip IV in 1308. The third sister-in-law, Joan, was initially said to have been present on some of these occasions and to have known of the affair; later accusations were extended to have included suggestions that she had also been involved in adultery herself.

Most historians have tended to conclude that the accusations against Blanche and Margaret were probably true, although some are more skeptical. Some accounts have suggested that Isabella's accusations were politically motivated; she had just given birth to her son, Edward, and in theory the removal of all three of her sisters-in-law might have made his accession to the French throne more likely. Others have argued that this seems an unlikely plan, given the normal probability that at least one of the three brothers would have successfully remarried and enjoyed a male heir in the coming years. Some contemporary chroniclers suggested that Philip IV's unpopular chamberlain Enguerrand de Marigny might have been responsible for framing the knights and women involved.

Following the period of surveillance, Philip IV broke the news of the accusations publicly and arrested all involved. There are some suggestions that Walter and Philip of Aunay attempted to escape to England but in due course both knights were interrogated and tortured by French officials. Both confessed to adultery and were found guilty, therefore, of lèse majesté. Blanche and Margaret were tried before the Paris Parlement and found guilty of adultery. The two women had their heads shaven and were sentenced to life imprisonment. Joan was also tried before the Parlement but was found innocent, partially as a result of her husband Philip's influence.

== Impact ==
House of Capet during the 1314 Tour de Nesle affair succession crisis

Philip the Bold (1245–1285); Philip III, King of France r. 1270–1285
Joan of Navarre (1273–1305); Joan I, Queen of Navarre r. 1274–1305	Philip the Fair (1268–1314); Philip I, King of Navarre r. 1284–1305; Philip IV, King of France r. 1285–1314	Charles of Valois (1270–1325)
Louis the Quarreller (1289–1316); Louis I, King of Navarre r. 1305–1316; Louis X, King of France r. 1314–1316	Philip the Tall (1293–1322); Philip V, King of France r. 1316–1322; Philip II, King of Navarre r. 1316–1322	Charles the Fair; Charles the Bald (1294–1328); Charles IV, King of France r. 1322–1328; Charles I, King of Navarre r. 1322–1328	Isabella of France (c. 1295–1358)	Edward of Caernarfon (1284–1327); Edward II, King of England	Philip the Fortunate; Philip of Valois (1293–1350); Philip VI, King of France r. 1328–1350
John the Posthumous (1316); John I, King of France; John I, King of Navarre r. 1316	Joan of Navarre (1312–1349); Joan II, Queen of Navarre r. 1328–1349	Joan III (1308–1347); Countess of Burgundy	Edward of Windsor (1312–1377); Edward III, King of England	John the Good (1319–1364); John II, King of France r. 1350–1364
Charles the Bad (1332–1387); Charles II, King of Navarre r. 1349–1387	Joan of Valois (1343–1373)	Charles the Wise (1338–1380); Charles V, King of France r. 1364–1380

The Tour de Nesle scandal led to the imprisonment of Blanche and Margaret, and the execution of their lovers. Having been tortured, the guilty knights Gautier and Philippe were then killed; most histories agree that they were first castrated and then either drawn and quartered or flayed alive, broken on a wheel and then hanged. The episode came as a severe shock to Philip IV and some suggest that it contributed to his death later that same year. Isabella was criticized by some in France for failing to stand by her sisters-in-law, although this passed with time; Isabella's own marriage failed catastrophically in due course, with many historians believing that she was responsible for the murder of her husband Edward in 1327 after Isabella's seizure of power in England with her lover Roger de Mortimer in 1326.

Due to the gap in the papacy between the death of Clement V in 1314 and the election of John XXII in 1316, Margaret's marriage to Louis could not be annulled, and she was imprisoned in an underground cell at Château Gaillard castle. Louis succeeded to the throne later that year after the death of Philip IV, being officially crowned in August 1315. Margaret, however, was still alive and thus became queen of France, but promptly died under suspicious circumstances, possibly murdered, on 14 August, whilst still imprisoned. Louis remarried five days later to Clementia of Hungary, the niece of Louis' own uncle and close advisor, Charles of Valois. Louis himself died a year later after falling ill following a challenging game of tennis.

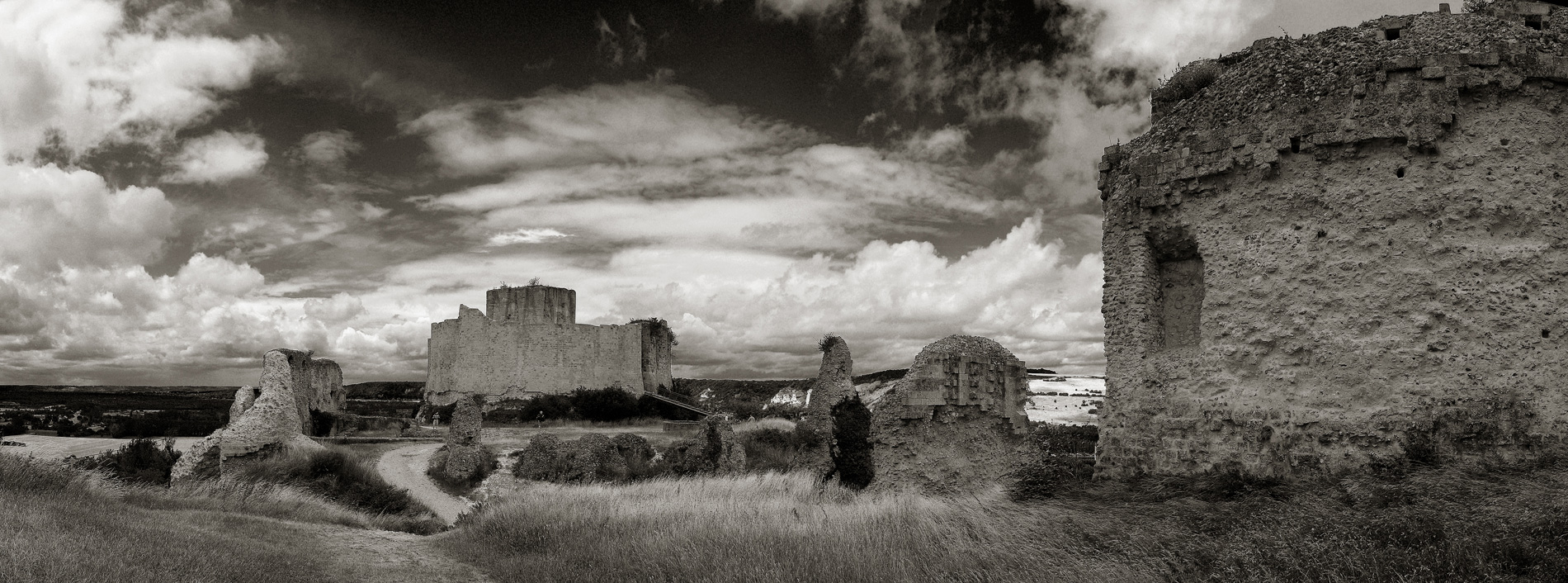
The ruins of Château Gaillard, where Margaret and Blanche were imprisoned after their sentencing for adultery in 1314

Joan was placed under house arrest at Dourdan in the aftermath of the Parlement acquittal amidst suggestions that she might also have been having an adulterous affair herself, but enjoyed the continuing support of her husband, Philip. Philip campaigned for her release, which was forthcoming the next year and Joan returned to court. It is unclear why Philip stood by her in the way that he did. One theory has been that he was concerned that if he was to abandon Joan, he might also lose Burgundy, which he had gained through their marriage; another theory suggests that he was in truth very deeply in love with her. With the death after a few days of the baby King John I of France, Joan served as Philip's queen consort for several years; after Philip's death, she inherited the County of Artois from her mother and finally died in 1330.

Blanche remained in prison at Château Gaillard as well for eight years until 1322, when Charles assumed the throne and she also technically became queen of France. Upon becoming king, Charles still refused to release Blanche, instead annulling their marriage and having Blanche confined to a nunnery. Charles remarried immediately afterwards to Marie of Luxembourg; Blanche died the next year, her health broken from the years spent underground.

== Aftermath and legacy ==
The affair badly damaged the reputation of women in senior French circles, contributing to the way that the Salic Law was implemented during subsequent arguments over the succession to the throne. When Louis died unexpectedly in 1316, supporters of his daughter Joan found that suspicions hung over her parentage following the scandal and that the French nobility were increasingly cautious over the concept of a woman inheriting the throne – Louis' brother, Philip took power instead, first as regent pending the birth of Louis' posthumous child, John, and then as king following that infant's death within days. Philip died unexpectedly young as well, and his younger brother Charles did not live long after remarrying after his coronation, similarly dying without male heirs. The interpretation of the Salic Law then placed the French succession in doubt. Despite Philip of Valois, the son of Charles of Valois, claiming the throne with French noble support, Edward III of England, the son of Isabella was able to press his own case, resulting in the ensuing Hundred Years War (1337–1453).

The affair would also have an impact in European culture. Scholars studying the theme of courtly love have observed that the narratives about adulterous queens die out shortly after the Tour de Nesle scandal, suggesting that they became less acceptable or entertaining after the executions and imprisonments in the French royal family. The Tour de Nesle guard-tower itself was destroyed in 1665.

The story of the affair was used by the French dramatist Alexandre Dumas as the basis for his play La Tour de Nesle in 1832, "a romantic thriller reconstructing medieval crimes on a grand scale". Le Roi de fer (1955), the first novel of Maurice Druon's seven-volume series Les Rois maudits (The Accursed Kings), describes the affair and the subsequent executions in lurid and imaginative detail. The novels have been adapted for television twice, in 1972 and 2005, and a new adaptation for film was announced in 2024.

== Bibliography ==
- Broad, Jacqueline and Karen Green. (2007) Virtue, Liberty, and Toleration: Political Ideas of European Women, 1400–1800. Dordrecht: Springer.
- Brown, Elizabeth, A. R. (2000) "The King's Conundrum: Endowing Queens and Loyal Servants, Ensuring Salvation, and Protecting the Patrimony in Fourteenth-Century France", in John Anthony Burrow and Ian P. Wei (eds). Medieval Futures: Attitudes to the Future in the Middle Ages, Woodbridge: The Boydell Press.
- Gillmeister, Heiner. (1998) Tennis: A Cultural History. London: Leicester University Press. ISBN 978-0-7185-0147-1.
- Hallam, Elizabeth M. and Judith Everard. (2001) Capetian France, 987–1328. Harlow: Pearson Education.
- Echols, Anne and Marty Williams. (1992) An Annotated Index of Medieval Women. Princeton: Markus Wiener.
- Jones, Michael and Rosamond McKitterick. (2000) The New Cambridge Medieval History: c. 1300–1415. Cambridge: Cambridge University Press.
- Lorentz, Phillipe and Dany Sandron. (2006) Atlas de Paris au Moyen Âge. Paris: Parigramme. ISBN 2-84096-402-3. (French)
- McCracken, Peggy. (1998) The Romance of Adultery: Queenship and Sexual Transgression in Old French Literature. Philadelphia: University of Pennsylvania Press.
- McGraw-Hill. (1984) McGraw-Hill Encyclopedia of World Drama, Volume 2. Verlag für die Deutsche Wirtschaft AG.
- Myers, A. R. (1978) England in the Late Middle Ages. Harmondsworth: Penguin Books.
- De Pisan, Christine. (2003) The Treasure of the City of Ladies, or The Book of the Three Virtues. London: Penguin Books.
- Sumption, Jonathan. (1999) The Hundred Years War: Trial by Battle. Philadelphia: Pennsylvania University Press.
- Wagner, John. A. (2006) Encyclopedia of the Hundred Years War. Westport: Greenwood Press.
- Weir, Alison. (2006) Isabella: She-Wolf of France, Queen of England. London: Pimlico.
