= Louis X of France =

King of France (1314–1316) and Navarre (1305–1316)

Louis X
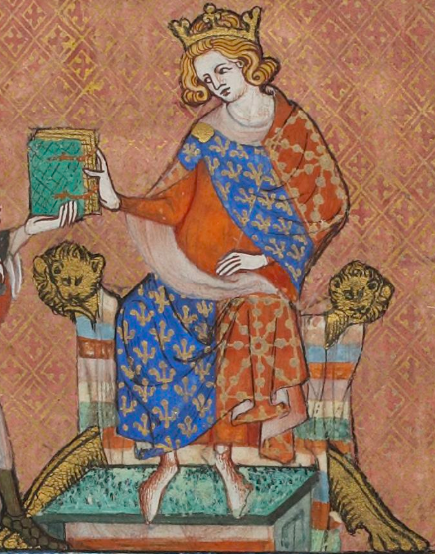
- Miniature depiction from the Life of Saint Louis, c. 1330–1340

King of France
- Reign: 29 November 1314 – 5 June 1316
- Coronation: 24 August 1315, Reims
- Predecessor: Philip IV
- Successor: John I

King of Navarre
- Reign: 2 April 1305 – 5 June 1316
- Coronation: 1 October 1307, Pamplona
- Predecessor: Joan I and Philip I
- Successor: John I
- Born: 4 October 1289; Paris, France
- Died: 5 June 1316 (aged 26); Vincennes, Val-de-Marne, France
- Burial: 7 June 1316; Saint Denis Basilica
- Spouses: Margaret of Burgundy (m. 1305; died 1315) Clementia of Hungary (m. 1315)
- Issue: Joan II of Navarre; John I of France; Eudeline
- House: Capet
- Father: Philip IV of France
- Mother: Joan I of Navarre

Louis X (4 October 1289 – 5 June 1316), known as the Quarrelsome (French: le Hutin), was King of France from 1314 and King of Navarre (as Louis I) from 1305 until his death. He emancipated serfs, who could buy their freedom, and readmitted Jews into the kingdom. His short reign in France was marked by tensions with the nobility, due to fiscal and centralisation reforms initiated during the reign of his father by Grand Chamberlain Enguerrand de Marigny.

Louis' first wife, Margaret, was implicated in the Tour de Nesle affair. She was found guilty of infidelity and imprisoned until her death in August 1315. Louis married Clémence of Hungary the same year, but the king died in 1316 leaving his wife pregnant. Queen Clémence gave birth to a boy, who was proclaimed king as John I, but the infant lived only five days. Louis' brother Philip, Count of Poitiers, succeeded John to become Philip V of France.

== Biography ==
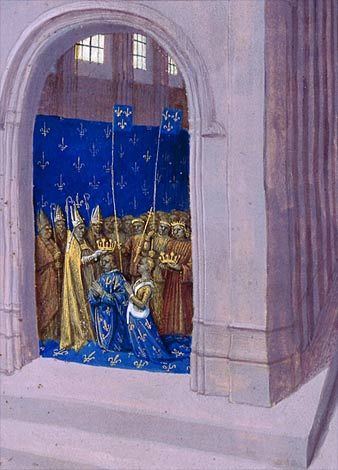
Louis being crowned with his second wife, Clementia of Hungary.

Louis was born in Paris, the eldest son of Philip IV of France and Joan I of Navarre. He inherited the kingdom of Navarre on the death of his mother, on 2 April 1305, and was crowned on 1 October 1307. On 21 September 1305, at age 15, he married Margaret of Burgundy and they had a daughter, Joan. Louis was known as "the Quarreler", "the Quarrelsome", as the result of the tensions prevailing throughout his reigns.

Both Louis and Margaret became involved in the Tour de Nesle affair towards the end of Philip's reign. In 1314, Margaret, Blanche and Joan — the latter two being the wives of Louis' brothers Charles and Philip, respectively — were arrested on charges of infidelity. Margaret and Blanche were both tried before the French parlement later that year and found guilty. Their alleged lovers were executed, and the women had their hair shorn and were sentenced to life imprisonment. Philip stood by his wife Joan, who was ultimately found innocent and released. Margaret would be imprisoned at Chateau Gaillard in Normandy.

On the death of his father in 1314, Louis became King of France. Margaret of Burgundy would not be released from imprisonment or crowned, but as his wife, she technically became Queen of France. Without an incumbent pope, Louis could not annul his marriage. The imprisoned Queen of France died on 14 August 1315 and Louis remarried five days later, on 19 August to Clémence of Hungary, the daughter of Charles Martel of Anjou and the niece of Louis' own uncle and close advisor, Charles of Valois. Louis and Clémence were crowned at Reims in August 1315.

== Marriage and issue ==
In 1305, Louis married Margaret of Burgundy, with whom he had a daughter, Joan II of Navarre. Margaret was later convicted of adultery, was imprisoned in Château Gaillard, caught a cold and died in 1315, although another source states that she was strangled to death. In 1315, Louis married Clémence of Hungary, who gave birth to John I of France five months after the king's death. The infant John's death a few days later led to a disputed succession. With an unknown woman, Louis had a daughter, Eudeline, who joined the Order of St. Claire and became the abbess of the Franciscan nuns of Paris, 1334-1339. (Note: Allirot states Eudeline was allegedly the biological daughter of Louis X.)

== Domestic policy ==
Louis was king of Navarre for eleven years and king of France for less than two years. His reign was dominated by continual feuding with the noble factions within the kingdom, and major reforms designed to increase royal revenues, such as the freeing of the French serfs and the readmittance of the Jews.

=== Regional leagues ===
By the end of Philip IV's reign opposition to the fiscal reforms was growing. With Philip's death and the accession of Louis, this opposition rapidly developed into more open revolt, some authors citing Louis' relative youth as one of the reasons behind the timing of the rebellions. Leagues of regional nobles began to form around the country, demanding changes. Charles of Valois took advantage of this movement to turn against his old enemy, Philip IV's former minister and chamberlain Enguerrand de Marigny, and convinced Louis to bring corruption charges against him. When these failed, Charles then convinced Louis to bring sorcery charges against him instead, which proved more effective and led to de Marigny's execution at Vincennes in April 1315. Other former ministers were similarly prosecuted. This, combined with the halting of Philip's reforms, the issuing of numerous charters of rights and a reversion to more traditional rule, largely assuaged the regional leagues.

=== Edict freeing serfs ===
In July 1315, Louis X issued an edict effectively abolishing serfdom in the royal domain. As a way of raising revenues, for his war against Flanders, and having alighted on a reform of French serfdom as a way of achieving this, he declared that French serfs would be freed, although each serf would have to purchase his freedom. A body of commissioners was established to undertake the reform, establishing the peculium, or value, of each serf. For serfs owned directly by the King, all of the peculium would be received by the Crown; for serfs owned by subjects of the King, the amount would be divided between the Crown and the owner.

=== Readmittance of Jews ===
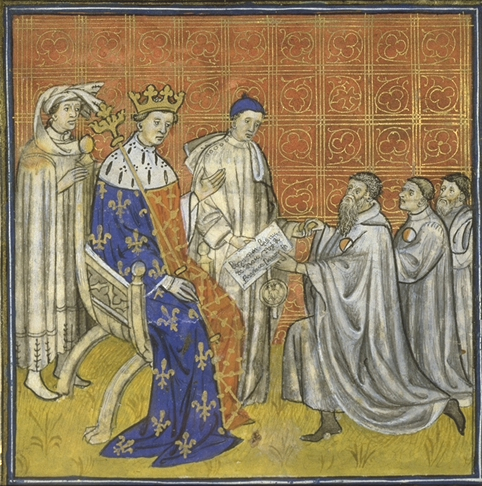
Louis receiving a diploma from the Jews, whom he readmitted to France under strict terms. Painting made in 14th century.

Louis was also responsible for a key shift in policy towards the Jews. In 1306, his father, Philip IV, had expelled the Jewish minority from across France, a "shattering" event for most of these communities. Louis began to reconsider this policy, motivated by the additional revenues that might be forthcoming to the Crown if the Jews were allowed to return. Accordingly, Louis issued a charter in 1315, readmitting the Jews subject to various conditions. The Jews would be admitted back into France for only twelve years, after which the agreement might be terminated; Jews were to wear an armband at all times; Jews could live only in those areas where there had been Jewish communities previously; Jews were initially to be forbidden from usury. This was the first time that French Jews had been covered by such a charter, and Louis was careful to justify his decision with reference to the policies of his ancestor Saint Louis IX, the position of Pope Clement V and an argument that the people of France had demanded a return of the Jews. The result was a much-weakened Jewish community that depended directly upon the King for their right of abode and protection.

=== Challenge of Flanders ===
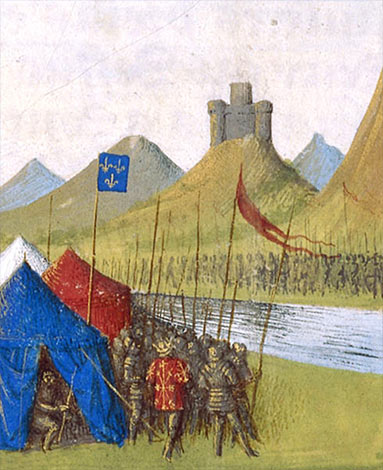
Louis campaigning in Flanders, where he sought a military solution to the ongoing problem of the "immensely wealthy", quasi-autonomous province of France. Painting circa 15th century.

Louis X continued the effort of his predecessor to achieve a military solution to the vexing problem of Flanders. The count of Flanders ruled an "immensely wealthy state" which enjoyed a largely autonomous existence on the margins of the French realm; French kings claimed to exercise suzerainty over Flanders, but heretofore with little success. Philip IV had attempted to assert royal overlordship, but his army, led by Robert II of Artois, had been defeated at Courtrai in 1302; despite a later French victory at the Battle of Mons-en-Pévèle the relationship remained testy and unsettled.

Louis mobilised an army along the Flemish border, but the French position rapidly became strained by the demands of maintaining a wartime footing. Louis had prohibited exports of grain and other material to Flanders in 1315. This proved challenging to enforce, and the king had to pressure officers of the Church in the borderlands, as well as Edward II of England, to support his effort to prevent Spanish merchant vessels from trading with the embargoed Flemish. An unintended result of the embargo was the rise of smuggling activities that reduced the advantage (and consequently the amount) of trading in compliance with royal restrictions in the border region. Louis was also forced to requisition food directly for his forces, resulting in a series of complaints from local lords and the Church.

== Death and legacy ==
Louis was a keen player of jeu de paume, or real tennis, and became notable as the first person to construct indoor tennis courts in the modern style. Louis was unhappy with playing tennis outdoors and accordingly had indoor, enclosed courts made in Paris "around the end of the 13th century". In due course this design spread across royal palaces all over Europe. On 5 June 1316 at Vincennes, following a particularly exhausting game, Louis drank a large quantity of cooled wine and subsequently died of either pneumonia or pleurisy, although there were also suspicions of poisoning. Because of the contemporary accounts of his death, Louis is history's first tennis player known by name. He and his second wife Clémence are interred in Saint Denis Basilica.

Louis' second wife Clémence was pregnant at the time of his death, leaving the succession in doubt. A son would have primacy over Louis' daughter, Joan. A daughter, however, would have a weaker claim to the throne, and would need to compete with Joan's own claims, although suspicions hung over Joan's parentage following the scandal of 1314. As a result, Louis' brother Philip was appointed regent for the five months remaining until the birth of his brother's child, John I, who lived only five days. Philip then succeeded in pressing his claims to the crowns of France and Navarre.

== In fiction ==
Louis is a major character in Les Rois maudits (The Accursed Kings), a series of French historical novels by Maurice Druon. He was portrayed by Georges Ser in the 1972 French miniseries adaptation of the series, and by Guillaume Depardieu in the 2005 adaptation.

== Bibliography ==
- Allirot, Anne-Helene (2016). "Longchamp and Lourcine: The Role of Female Abbeys in the Construction of Capetian Memory (Late Thirteenth Century to Mid-Fourteenth Century". In Brenner, Elma; Franklin-Brown, Mary; Cohen, Meredith (eds.). Memory and Commemoration in Medieval Culture. Translated by Beer, Lewis. Routledge.
- Bradbury, Jim (2007). The Capetians: Kings of France 987–1328. Hambledon Continuum.
- Bishop, Morris. (2001) The Middle Ages. Houghton Mifflin Harcourt.
- Brissaud, Jean (1915). A History of French Public Law. Boston, Little, Brown and Company.
- Chazan, Robert (1979). Church, State, and Jew in the Middle Ages. Behrman House.
- Emmerson, Richard Kenneth and Sandra Clayton-Emmerson. (2006) Key Figures in Medieval Europe: An Encyclopedia. New York: Routledge.
- Falconieri, Tommaso di Carpegna (2009). The Man Who Believed He Was King of France: A True Medieval Tale. University of Chicago Press.
- Finch, Julia (2019). "Of Movement, Monarchs, and Manuscripts: the Case for Jeanne II of Navarre's Picture Bible as a Geopolitical Bridge between Paris and Pamplona". In Proctor-Tiffany, Mariah; Hamilton, Tracy Chapman (eds.). Moving Women Moving Objects (400–1500). Brill. pp. 181–204.
- Gaude-Ferragu, Murielle (2005). D' Or et de cendres: La mort et les funérailles des princes dans le royaume de France au bas Moyen Âge (in French). Villeneuve d'Ascq: Presses Universitaires du Septentrion. p. 285. ISBN 2859398783. "...il n'avait pu se rendre aux funérailles célébrées deux jours après la mort du roi."
- Gaude-Ferragau, Murielle (2016). Queenship in Medieval France, 1300-1500. Translated by Krieger, Angela. Palgrave Macmillan.
- Gillmeister, Heiner. (1998) Tennis: A Cultural History. London: Leicester University Press. ISBN 978-0-7185-0147-1
- Harding, Alan (2001). Medieval Law and the Foundations of the State. Oxford University Press.
- Holmes, George. (2000) Europe, Hierarchy and Revolt, 1320–1450, 2nd edition. Oxford: Blackwell.
- Jeudwine, John Wynne. (1983) Tort, Crime, and Police in Mediaeval Britain: a review of some early law and custom. London: Wm. S. Hein Publishing.
- Jordan, William Chester. (1996) The Great Famine: Northern Europe in the early Fourteenth Century. Princeton: Princeton University Press.
- Jordan, William Chester (2005). Unceasing Strife, Unending Fear: Jacques de Therines and the Freedom of the Church in the Age of the Last Capetians. Princeton University Press.
- Konta, Annie Lemp (1914). The History of French literature from the Oath of Strasburg to Chanticler. D. Appleton and Company.
- Kézai, Simon (1999). Gesta Hungarorum: The Deeds of the Hungarians. Central European University Press.
- Kulsrud, Carl Jacob. (2005) Maritime Neutrality to 1780: a history of the main principles governing neutrality and belligerency to 1780. Clark: Law Book Exchange.
- Lea, Henry Charles. (1887) A History of the Inquisition of the Middle Ages, Part Three. London: Harper.
- Lucas, Henry S. (1946). "The Low Countries and the Disputed Imperial Election of 1314". Speculum. 21, No. 1 (Jan.) (1). The University of Chicago Press: 72–114. doi:10.2307/2856839. JSTOR 2856839. S2CID 162348376.
- Newman, Paul B. (2001) Daily Life in the Middle Ages. Jefferson: McFarland.
- Rose, Hugh James. (1857) A New General Biographical Dictionary, Volume 11. London: Fellows.
- Sellery, George C. (2007) The Founding of Western Civilization. Read Book.
- Stephen, James. (2008) Lectures on the History of France. Read Book.
- Wagner, John. A. (2006) Encyclopedia of the Hundred Years War. Westport: Greenwood Press.
- Woodacre, Elena (2013). The Queens Regnant of Navarre. Palgrave Macmillan.

== Related articles ==
- Charter to the Normans

Louis X of France and I of Navarre House of Capet Born: 4 October 1289 Died: 5 June 1316
Regnal titles
| Preceded by Philip IV | King of France; 1314–1316 | Vacant Title next held by John I |
| Preceded by Joan I Philip I | King of Navarre; 1305–1316 | Vacant Title next held by John I |
| Preceded by Joan I Philip I | Count of Champagne; 1305–1314 | Royal domain |
