= Château Gaillard =

French medieval castle in Les Andelys, Normandy

- Les Andelys, France
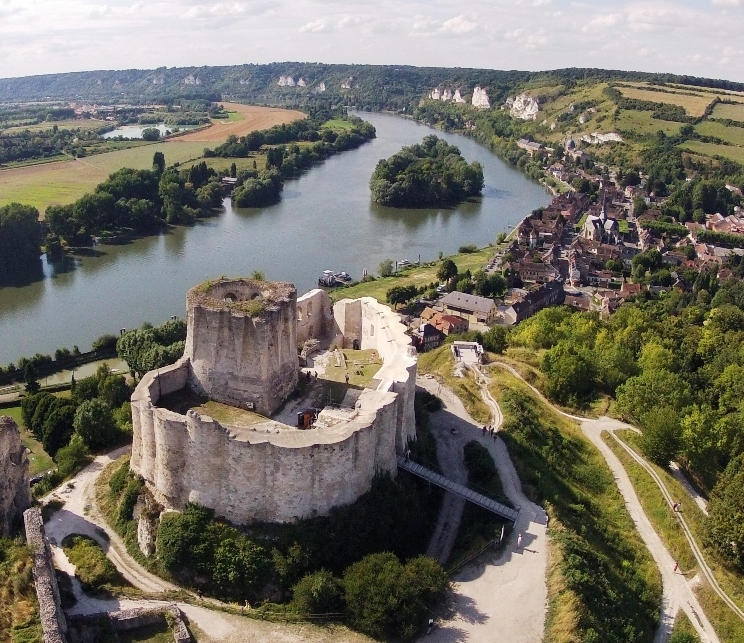
- Château Gaillard's inner bailey

Site information
- Type: Concentric castle
- Condition: Ruins

Location
- Location within France
- Coordinates: 49.238°N 1.4025°E

Site history
- Built: c. 1196–1198
- Built by: Richard the Lionheart, King of England
- Materials: Limestone
- Demolished: 1599–1611
- Battles/wars: Siege of Château Gaillard 1203–1204
- Events: Angevin Empire; Hundred Years' War

Garrison information
- Past commanders: (England) Roger de Lacy
- Occupants: Duchy of Normandy; Kingdom of England; Kingdom of France

Château Gaillard (French pronunciation: [ʃɑto ɡajaʁ]) is a medieval castle ruin overlooking the River Seine above the commune of Les Andelys, in the French department of Eure, in Normandy. It is located some 95 kilometres (59 mi) north-west of Paris and 40 kilometres (25 mi) from Rouen. Construction began in 1196 under the auspices of Richard the Lionheart, who was simultaneously King of England and feudal Duke of Normandy. The castle was expensive to build, but the majority of the work was done in an unusually short period of time. It took just two years and, at the same time, the town of Petit Andely was constructed. Château Gaillard has a complex and advanced design, and uses early principles of concentric fortification; it was also one of the earliest European castles to use machicolations. The castle consists of three enclosures separated by dry moats, with a keep in the inner enclosure.

Château Gaillard was captured in 1204 by the king of France, Philip II, after a lengthy siege. In the mid-14th century, the castle was the residence of the exiled David II of Scotland. The castle changed hands several times in the Hundred Years' War, but in 1449 the French king captured Château Gaillard from the English king definitively, and from then on it remained in French ownership. Henry IV of France ordered the demolition of Château Gaillard in 1599; although it was in ruins at the time, it was felt to be a threat to the security of the local population. The castle ruins are listed as a monument historique by the French Ministry of Culture. The inner bailey is open to the public from March to November, and the outer baileys are open all year.

== History ==
=== Background ===
Richard the Lionheart inherited Normandy from his father, Henry II, in 1189 when he ascended the throne of England. There was a rivalry between the Capets and the Plantagenets, Richard as the Plantagenet king of England was more powerful than the Capetian king of France, despite the fact that Richard was a vassal of the French king and paid homage for his lands in the country. From 1190 to 1192, Richard the Lionheart was on the Third Crusade. He was joined by Philip II of France as each was wary that the other might invade his territory in his absence. Richard was captured and imprisoned on the return journey to England, and he was not released until 4 February 1194. In Richard's absence, his brother John revolted with the aid of Philip; amongst Philip's conquests in the period of Richard's imprisonment was the Norman Vexin and a few towns around such as Le Vaudreuil, Verneuil and Évreux. It took Richard until 1198 to reconquer a part of it.

=== Construction ===
Perched high above the River Seine, an important transport route, the site of Château Gaillard, in the manor of Andeli, was identified as a naturally defensible position. In the valley below the site was the town of Grand Andely. Under the terms of the Treaty of Louviers (January 1196) between Richard and Philip II neither king was allowed to fortify the site; despite this, Richard intended to build a castle at Andeli. Its purpose was to protect the duchy of Normandy from Philip II—it helped fill a gap in the Norman defences left by the fall of Château de Gisors and above all Château de Gaillon, a castle which belonged to Philip and used as an advanced French fortification to block the Seine valley—and to act as a base from which Richard could launch his campaign to take back the Norman Vexin from French control. Indeed, Les Andelys is located just in front of Gaillon on the other side of the Seine valley. Richard tried to obtain the manor through negotiation. Walter de Coutances, Archbishop of Rouen, was reluctant to sell the manor as it was one of the diocese's most profitable, and other lands belonging to the diocese had recently been damaged by war. When Philip besieged Aumale in northern Normandy, on the border with Picardy, Richard grew tired of waiting and seized the manor, although the act was opposed by the Church.

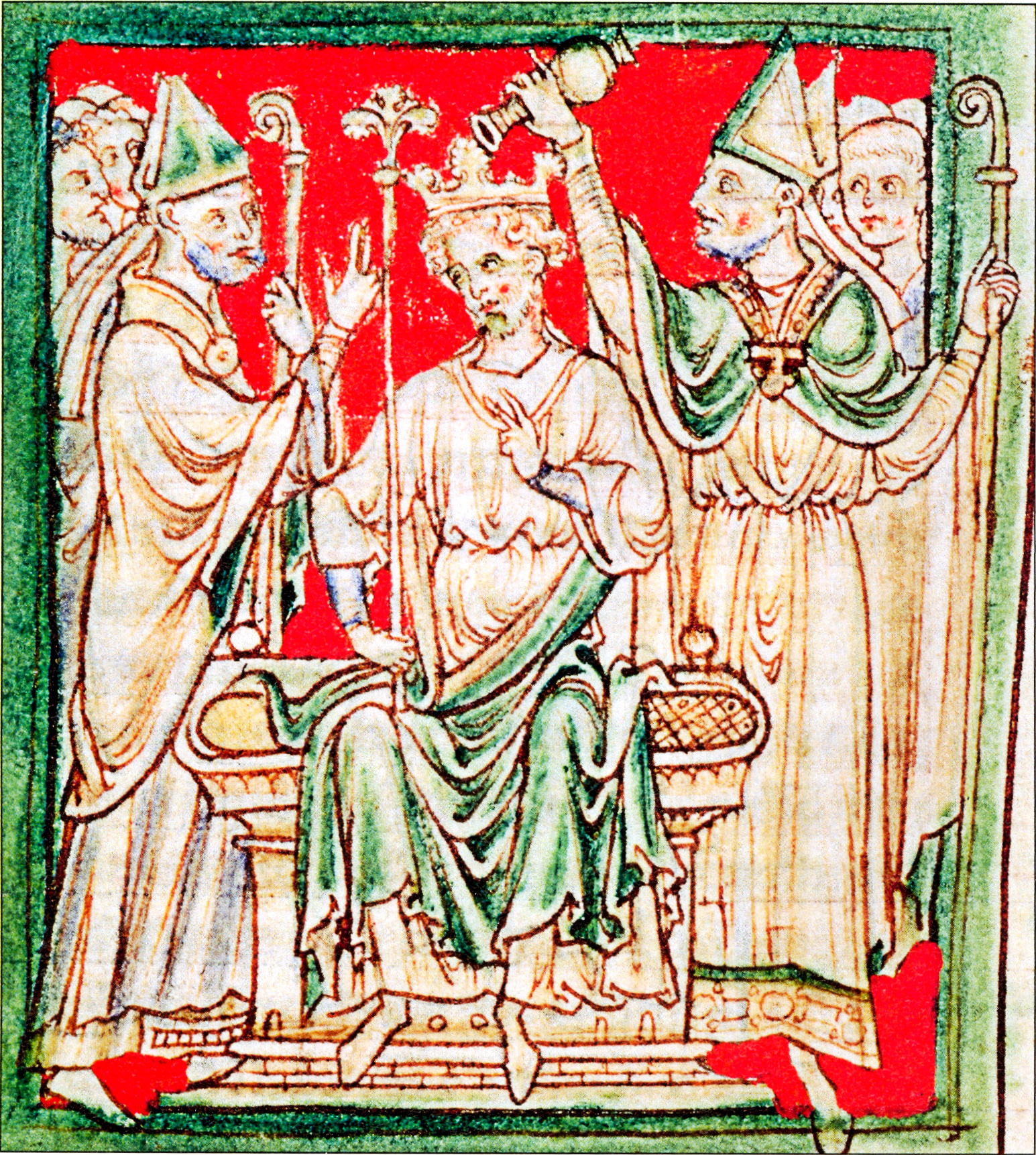
A 13th-century depiction of Richard I's coronation which took place seven years before the construction of Château Gaillard began.

In an attempt to get Pope Celestine III to intercede, Walter de Coutances left for Rome in November 1196. Richard sent a delegation to represent him in Rome. One of the parties, Richard's Lord Chancellor William Longchamp (who was also Bishop of Ely), died during the journey, although the rest, including Philip of Poitou, Bishop of Durham, and Guillaume de Ruffière, Bishop of Lisieux, arrived in Rome. Walter de Coutances meanwhile issued an interdict against the duchy of Normandy which prohibited church services from being performed in the region. Roger of Howden detailed "the unburied bodies of the dead lying in the streets and square of the cities of Normandy". Construction began with the interdict hanging over Normandy, but it was later repealed in April 1197 by Celestine, after Richard made gifts of land to Walter de Coutances and the diocese of Rouen, including two manors and the prosperous port of Dieppe. The site of Château Gaillard had not been fortified before, and the town of Petit Andely was constructed at the same time; together with the historical Grand Andely, the two are known as Les Andelys. The castle sits on a high limestone promontory, 90 m above Les Andelys and overlooking a bend in the River Seine. The castle was connected with Les Andelys through a series of contemporary outworks.

During King Richard's reign, the Crown's expenditure on castles declined from the levels spent by Henry II, Richard's father, although this has been attributed to a concentration of resources on Richard's war with the king of France. However, the work at Château Gaillard cost an estimated £12,000 between 1196 and 1198. Richard only spent an estimated £7,000 on castles in England during his reign, similar to his father Henry II. The Pipe rolls for the construction of Château Gaillard contain the earliest details of how work was organised in castle building and what activities were involved. Amongst those workmen mentioned in the rolls are miners, stone cutters, quarrymen, masons, lime workers, carpenters, smiths, hodmen, water carriers, soldiers to guard the workers, diggers who cut the ditch surrounding the castle, and carters who transported the raw materials to the castle. A master mason is omitted, and military historian Allen Brown has suggested that it may be because Richard himself was the overall architect; this is supported by the interest Richard showed in the work through his frequent presence.

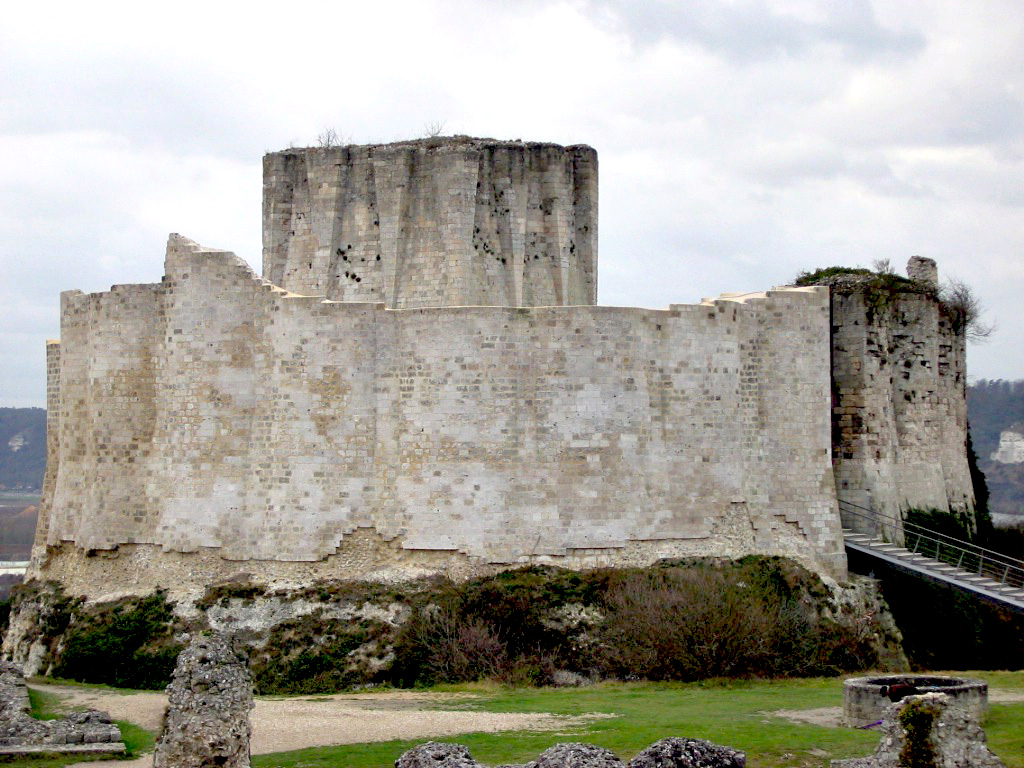
The keep of Château Gaillard is surrounded by a moat.

Not only was the castle built at considerable expense, but it was built relatively rapidly; construction of large stone castles often took the better part of a decade; for instance, the work at Dover Castle took place between 1179 and 1191 (at a cost of £7,000). Richard was present during part of the construction to ensure construction proceeded at a rate he was happy with. According to William of Newburgh, in May 1198 Richard and the labourers working on the castle were drenched in a "rain of blood". While some of his advisers thought the rain was an evil omen, Richard was undeterred:

the king was not moved by this to slacken one whit the pace of work, in which he took such keen pleasure that, unless I am mistaken, even if an angel had descended from heaven to urge its abandonment he would have been roundly cursed.

— William of Newburgh

After just a year, Château Gaillard was approaching completion and Richard remarked "Behold, how fair is this year-old daughter of mine!" Richard later boasted that he could hold the castle "were the walls made of butter". By 1198, the castle was largely completed. At one point, the castle was the site of the execution of three soldiers of the king of France in retaliation for a massacre of Welsh mercenaries ambushed by the French; the three were thrown to their deaths from the castle's position high above the surrounding landscape. In his final years, the castle became Richard's favourite residence, and writs and charters were written at Château Gaillard, bearing "apud Bellum Castrum de Rupe" (at the Fair Castle of the Rock). Richard did not enjoy the benefits of the castle for long, however, as he died in Limousin on 6 April 1199, from an infected arrow wound to his shoulder, sustained while besieging Châlus.

=== The Siege of Château Gaillard ===
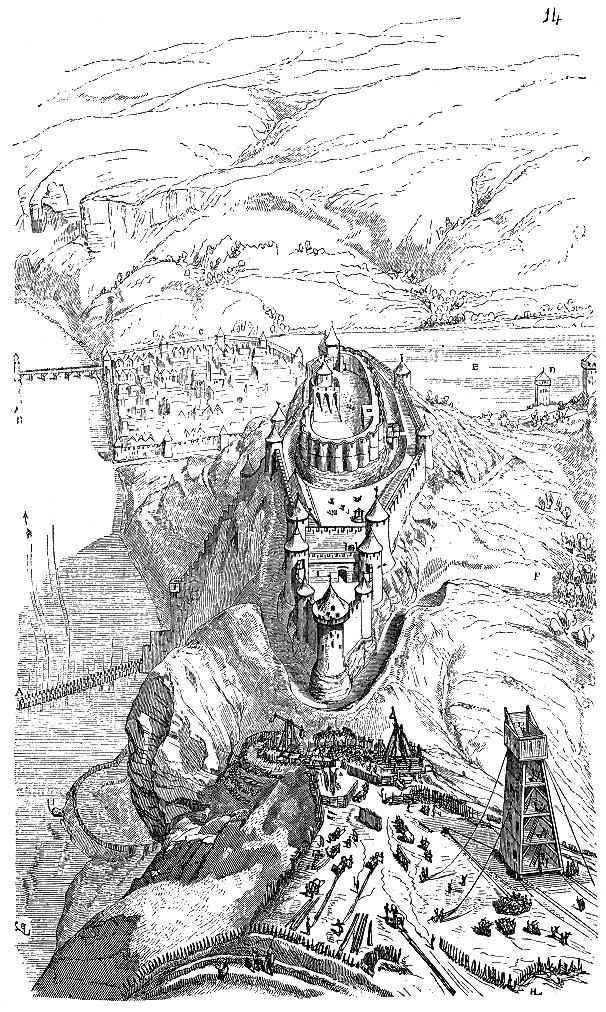
An impression by Eugène Viollet-le-Duc, a 19th-century architect experienced in renovating castles, of how the Siege of Château Gaillard would have looked

After Richard's death, King John of England failed to effectively defend Normandy against Philip's ongoing campaigns between 1202 and 1204. The Château de Falaise fell to Philip's forces, as well as castles from Mortain to Pontorson while Philip simultaneously besieged Rouen, which capitulated to French forces on 24 June 1204, effectively ending Norman independence. Philip laid siege to Château Gaillard, which was captured after a long siege from September 1203 to March 1204. The main source for the siege is Philippidos, a poem by William the Breton, Philip's chaplain. As a result, modern scholars have paid little attention to the fate of the civilians of Les Andelys during the siege.

The local Norman population sought refuge in the castle to escape from the French soldiers who ravaged the town. The castle was well supplied for a siege, but the extra mouths to feed rapidly diminished the stores. Between 1,400 and 2,200 non-combatants were allowed inside, increasing the number of people in the castle at least fivefold. In an effort to alleviate the pressure on the castle's supplies, Roger de Lacy, the castellan, evicted 500 civilians; this first group was allowed to pass through the French lines unhindered, and a second group of similar size did the same a few days later. Philip was not present, and when he learned of the safe passage of the civilians, he forbade further people being allowed through the siege lines. The idea was to keep as many people as possible within Château Gaillard to drain its resources. Roger de Lacy evicted the remaining civilians from the castle, at least 400 people, and possibly as many as 1,200. The group was not allowed through, and the French opened fire on the civilians, who turned back to the castle for safety, but found the gates locked. They sought refuge at the base of the castle walls for three months; over the winter, more than half their number died from exposure and starvation. Philip arrived at Château Gaillard in February 1204, and ordered that the survivors should be fed and released. Such treatment of civilians in sieges was not uncommon, and such scenes were repeated much later at the sieges of Calais in 1346 and Rouen in 1418–1419, both in the Hundred Years' War.

The French gained access to the outermost ward by undermining its advanced main tower. Following this, Philip ordered a group of his men to look for a weak point in the castle. They gained access to the next ward via the chapel. After ambushing several unsuspecting guards, and setting fire to the buildings, Philip's men then lowered the movable bridge and allowed the rest of their army into the castle. The Anglo-Norman troops retreated to the inner ward. After a short time, the French successfully breached the gate of the inner ward, and the garrison retreated finally to the keep. With supplies running low, Roger de Lacy and his garrison of 20 knights and 120 other soldiers surrendered to the French army, bringing the siege to an end on 6 March 1204. In drawn-out medieval sieges, contemporary writers often emphasised the importance of dwindling supplies in the capitulation of the garrison, as was the case with the Siege of Château Gaillard. With the castle under French control, the main obstacle to the French entering the Seine valley was removed; they were able to enter the valley unmolested and take Normandy. Thus, for the first time since it had been given as a duchy to Rollo in 911, Normandy was directly ruled by the French king. The city of Rouen surrendered to Philip II on 23 June 1204. After that, the rest of Normandy was easily conquered by the French.

=== Under French control ===
In 1314, Château Gaillard was the prison of Margaret and Blanche of Burgundy, who both later became queens of France; they had been convicted of adultery in the Tour de Nesle Affair, and after having their heads shaved they were locked away in the fortress, where they remained, including throughout their respective reigns. Following the Scottish defeat at the Battle of Halidon Hill in 1333, during the Second War of Scottish Independence, the child-king David II and certain of his court were forced to flee to France for safety. At the time, southern Scotland was occupied by the forces of King Edward III of England. David, then nine years old, and his bride Joan, the twelve-year-old daughter of Edward II, were granted the use of Château Gaillard by Philip VI. It remained their residence until David returned to Scotland in 1341. The archaeologists Gordon Ewart and Dennis Gallagher suggest that David may have been influenced by Château Gaillard's keep when building a great tower at Edinburgh Castle. David did not stay out of English hands for long after his return; he was captured after the Battle of Neville's Cross in 1346 and was imprisoned for eleven years in the Tower of London.

During the Hundred Years' War between the English and French crowns, possession of the castle switched several times. Château Gaillard—along with Château de Gisors, Ivry-la-Bataille, and Mont Saint-Michel—was one of four castles in Normandy which offered resistance to Henry V of England in 1419, after the capitulation of Rouen and much of the rest of the Duchy. Château Gaillard was besieged for a year before it was surrendered to the English in December 1419; all the resisting castles except Mont Saint-Michel eventually fell, and Normandy was temporarily returned to English control. Étienne de Vignolles, a mercenary (routier) known as La Hire, then recaptured Château Gaillard for the French in 1430. However, the English were revived by the capture and execution of Joan of Arc, and although by then the war was turning against them, a month later they captured Château Gaillard again. When the French gained ascendancy again between 1449 and 1453, the English were forced out of the region, and in 1449 the castle was taken by the French for the last time.

By 1573, Château Gaillard was uninhabited and in a ruinous state, but it was still believed that the castle posed a threat to the local population if it was repaired. Therefore, at the request of the French States-General, King Henry IV ordered the demolition of Château Gaillard in 1599. Some of the building material was reused by Capuchin monks who were granted permission to use the stone for maintaining their monasteries. In 1611, the demolition of Château Gaillard came to an end. The site was left as a ruin, and in 1862 was classified as a monument historique. In 1962, a conference on the contributions of the Normans to medieval military architecture was held at Les Andelys. Allen Brown attended the conference and remarked that the castle was "in satisfying receipt of skilful care and attention". The conference has taken place since on a two year cycle with the proceedings published in as Château Gaillard: Études de Castellogie Médiévale. In the 1990s, archaeological excavations were carried out at Château Gaillard. The excavations investigated the north of the fortress, searching for an entrance postulated by architect Eugène Viollet-le-Duc, but none was found. The excavation did reveal was that there was an addition to the north of the castle to enable the use of guns. Typologically, the structure has been dated to the 16th century. The conclusion of the excavations was that the site had "enormous archaeological potential", but that there were still unanswered questions about the castle. After Philip II took Chateau Gaillard, he repaired the collapsed tower of the outer bailey that had been used to gain access to the castle. The archaeological investigation examined the tower generally thought to be the one collapsed by Philip, and although it did not recover any dating evidence, the consensus is that he completely rebuilt the tower. In conjunction with the archaeological work, efforts were made to preserve the remaining structures. Today, Château Gaillard's inner bailey is open to the public from March to November, while the outer baileys are open all year round.

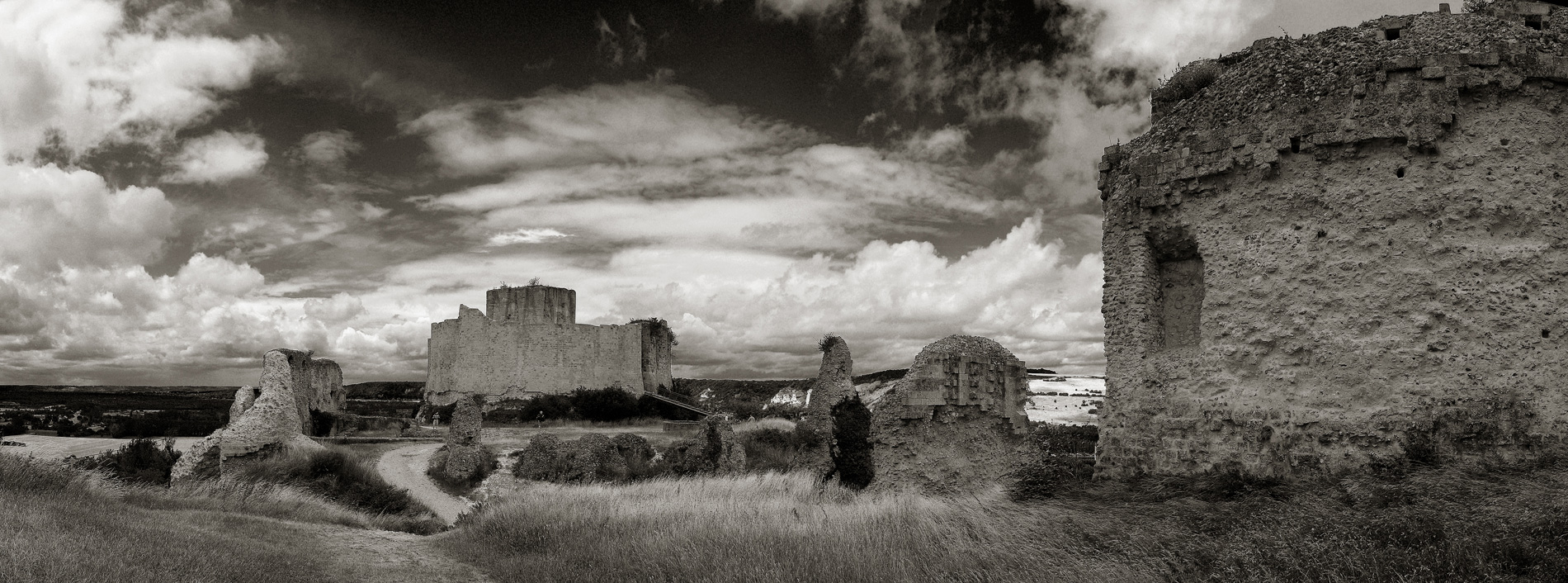
The ruins of Château Gaillard from within the outer bailey, looking northwest. In the background is the keep and wall around the inner bailey; the other ruins are part of the walls of the middle and outer baileys.
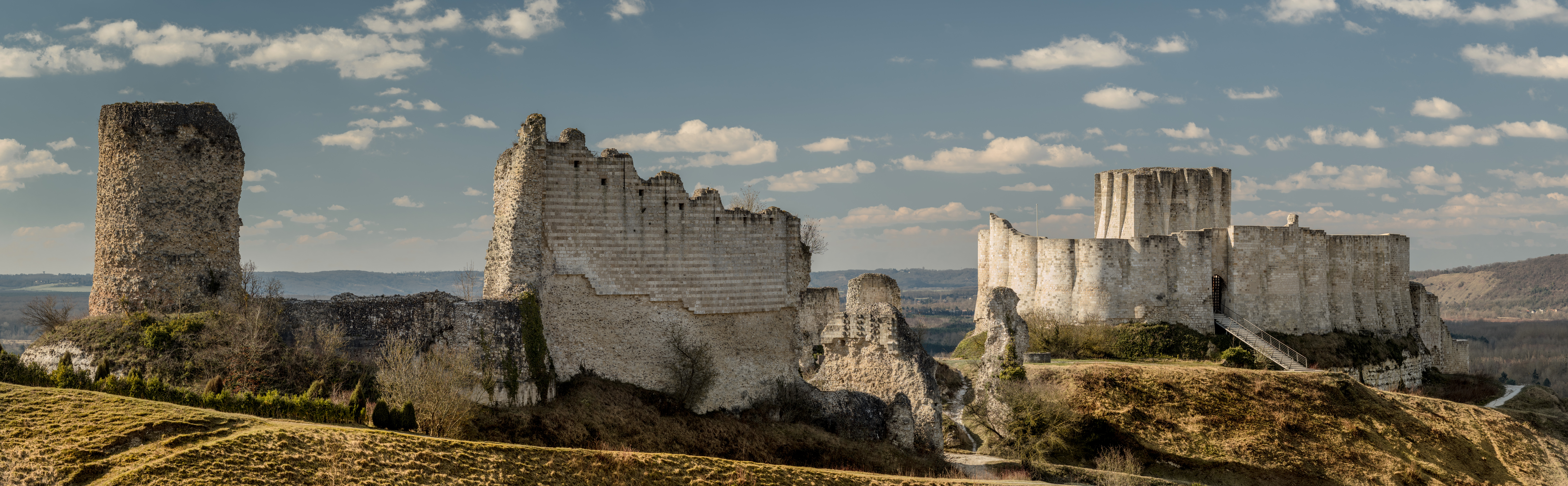
The ruins of Château Gaillard from the east. The keep is on the far right and the ruins of the outer bailey, including remains of some of the towers, are on the left.

== Layout and innovations ==
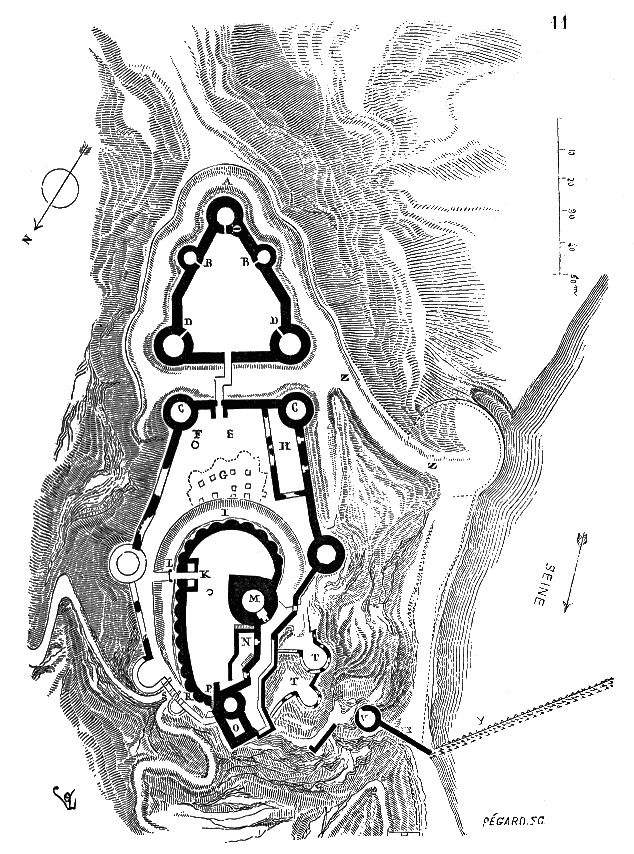
A plan of Château Gaillard by Eugene Viollet-le-Duc, with north pointing to the bottom-left-hand corner. The inner bailey and keep is at the bottom of the plan and the outer bailey is at the top. But there is at least one mistake, the tower supposed to contain the latrines on the right of the keep, was not round but square.

Château Gaillard consists of three baileys—an inner, a middle, and an outer with the main entrance to the castle—and a keep, also called a donjon, in the inner bailey. The baileys, which were separated by rock-cut ditches, housed the castle's stables, workshops, and storage facilities. It is common for extant castles to be the result of several phases of construction, adapted and added to over the period of their use; however, Château Gaillard essentially is the result of one period of building. The division into three wards bears similarities with the design of Château de Chinon, built by Henry II in the mid-12th century on a promontory overlooking a town.

The outer bailey is the southernmost feature of the castle; it is pentagon shaped and there are five towers spaced along the wall, three of which are at corners. North of the outer bailey is the middle bailey which is an irregular polygon; like the outer bailey, the wall of the middle bailey is studded with towers. The towers allowed the garrison to provide enfilading fire. In the fashion of the time, most of the towers in the curtain walls of the middle and outer baileys were cylindrical. Château Gaillard was one of the first castles in Europe to use machicolations—stone projections on top of a wall with openings that allowed objects to be dropped on an enemy at the base of the wall. Machicolations were introduced to Western architecture as a result of the Crusades. Until the 13th century, the tops of towers in European castles had usually been surrounded by wooden galleries, which served the same purpose as machicolations. An Eastern innovation, they may have originated in the first half of the 8th century.

Within the middle bailey was the inner bailey. The gatehouse from the middle of the inner bailey was one of the earliest examples of towers flanking the entrance to remove the blind spot immediately in front of the gate. This was part of a wider trend from around the late 12th or 13th century onwards for castle gateways to be strongly defended.

The design of the inner bailey, with its wall studded with semicircular projections, is unparalleled. This innovation had two advantages: firstly, the rounded wall absorbed the damage from siege engines much better as it did not provide a perfect angle to aim at; secondly, the arrowslits in the curved wall allowed arrows to be fired at all angles. The inner bailey, which contained the main residential buildings, used the principles of concentric defence. This and the unusual design of the inner bailey's curtain wall meant that castle was advanced for its age, since it was built before concentric fortification was fully developed in Crusader castles such as Krak des Chevaliers. Concentric castles were widely copied across Europe; for instance, when Edward I of England—who had himself been on Crusade—built castles in Wales in the late 13th century, four of the eight he founded were concentric.

The keep was inside the inner bailey and contained the king's accommodation. It had two rooms: an antechamber and an audience room. While Allen Brown interpreted the audience room as the king's chamber, historian Liddiard believes it is probably a throne room. A throne room emphasises the political importance of the castle. In England there is nothing similar to Château Gaillard's keep, but there are buildings with a similar design in France in the 12th and 13th centuries.

Allen Brown described Château Gaillard as "one of the finest castles in Europe" and the military historian Sir Charles Oman wrote that:

Château Gaillard, as we have already had occasion to mention, was considered the masterpiece of its time. The reputation of its builder, Coeur de Lion, as a great military engineer might stand firm on this single structure. He was no mere copyist of the models he had seen in the East, but introduced many original details of his own invention into the stronghold.

— Oman 1924

Despite Château Gaillard's reputation as a great fortress, Liddiard highlights the absence of a well in the keep as a peculiar weakness, and the castle was built on soft chalk, which would have allowed the walls to be undermined. But other sources evoke the presence of three wells in the three different baileys and the soft chalk does not really weaken the very thick walls. Its weakness is more the result of its location (higher hill behind), its extension (more than 200 metres (660 ft)) on a long narrow ridge and the difficulties in linking up the different baileys to allow a good communication and to secure an efficient defence without a large garrison.

Château Gaillard was important not solely as a military structure, but as a salient symbol of the power of Richard the Lionheart. It was a statement of dominance by Richard, having reconquered the lands Philip II had taken. Castles such as Château Gaillard in France, and Dover Castle in England, were amongst the most advanced of their age, but were surpassed in both sophistication and cost by the works of Edward I of England in the latter half of the 13th century.

== See also ==
- List of castles in France
