= Margaret of Burgundy, Queen of France =

Queen of France and Navarre from 1314 to 1315

Margaret of Burgundy
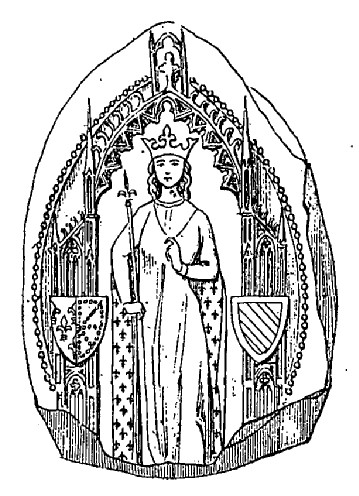
- Reproduction of Queen Margaret's seal

Queen consort of France
- Tenure: 1314–1315

Queen consort of Navarre
- Tenure: 1305–1315
- Born: c. 1290
- Died: 30 April 1315 (aged 24–25); Château Gaillard, Normandy
- Spouse: Louis X of France (m. 1305)
- Issue: Joan II of Navarre
- House: Burgundy
- Father: Robert II, Duke of Burgundy
- Mother: Agnes of France

Margaret of Burgundy (French: Marguerite; 1290 – 30 April 1315) was Queen of France and Navarre as the first wife of King Louis X; however, she was locked in prison during her whole French queenship.

== Life ==
Margaret was born in 1290. She was the second daughter of Robert II, Duke of Burgundy (1248–1306) and Agnes of France (1260–1327), the youngest daughter of Louis IX of France and Margaret of Provence. As such, she was a member of House of Burgundy, a branch of the Capetian dynasty.

In 1305, Margaret married her first cousin once removed, Louis, who had inherited the crown of Navarre from his deceased mother, Queen Joan I. They had one daughter, Joan (born 1312, died 1349).

Early in 1314, Margaret was caught in an alleged act of adultery in the Tour de Nesle affair. Her sister-in-law Isabella of France was a witness against her, and Margaret was imprisoned at Château Gaillard along with her sister-in-law Blanche of Burgundy.

In November of the same year, Louis I of Navarre ascended the French throne as Louis X of France, thus Margaret became Queen of France. However, she remained confined, as Louis would not revoke her punishment for adultery, nor have her crowned as a queen consort. Without an incumbent pope, Louis had no means of annulling his marriage. After poor treatment in prison, Queen Margaret caught a cold and died in 1315, although another source states that she was strangled to death.

== Legacy ==
Margaret's daughter, Joan, later became queen regnant of Navarre as Joan II (1311–1349). Her paternity was under doubt because of her mother's alleged adultery. On his deathbed, Louis formally recognized Joan as his daughter.

In 1361, Margaret's succession rights became important in the premature death of Philip I, Duke of Burgundy (her grandnephew), since the closest Burgundian heirs were descendants of Margaret and of her sister, Joan the Lame. Margaret's grandson and heir Charles II of Navarre claimed the duchy on the basis of primogeniture, but Joan the Lame's son John II of France on the basis of proximity, being one generation closer to the Burgundian dukes. As king, John ruled in his own favor and became Duke of Burgundy, later bestowing the Duchy upon his son, Philip the Bold.

== In fiction ==
Margaret is portrayed in Le Roi de Fer and La Reine Étranglée, two 1955 novels in Maurice Druon's Les Rois Maudits (The Accursed Kings) series of historical novels. She was played by Muriel Baptiste in the 1972 French miniseries adaptation of the series, and by Hélène Fillières in the 2005 adaptation.

Margaret appears as a pivotal character in the second season of the American historical drama series Knightfall where she is portrayed by Clementine Nicholson.

== Sources ==
- Bradbury, Jim (2007). The Capetians: Kings of France, 987-1328. Continuum Books.
- Echols, Anne; Williams, Marty (1992). An Annotated Index of Medieval Women. Markus Weiner Publishing Inc.
- Finch, Julia (2019). "Of Movement, Monarchs, and Manuscripts: the Case for Jeanne II of Navarre's Picture Bible as a Geopolitical Bridge between Paris and Pamplona". In Proctor-Tiffany, Mariah; Hamilton, Tracy Chapman (eds.). Moving Women Moving Objects (400–1500). Brill. pp. 181–204.

Margaret of Burgundy, Queen of France House of Burgundy Cadet branch of the Capetian dynasty Born: c. 1290 Died: 30 April 1315
French royalty
Vacant Title last held by Blanche of Artois	Queen consort of Navarre; 1305–1315	Vacant Title next held by Clementia of Hungary
Vacant Title last held by Joan I of Navarre	Queen consort of France; 1314–1315	Vacant Title next held by Clementia of Hungary
