= Edmund Crouchback =

English nobleman (1245–1296)

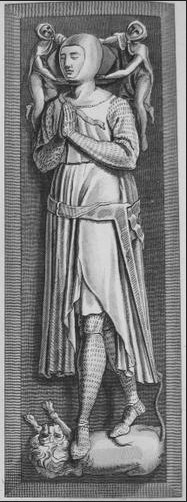
- Effigy and monument of Edmund Crouchback, Westminster Abbey

Earl of Lancaster, Leicester, Derby and jure uxoris Count of Champagne
- Predecessor: None (position established)
- Successor: Thomas of Lancaster
- Born: 16 January 1245; London, England
- Died: 5 June 1296 (aged 51); Bayonne, Duchy of Aquitaine
- Burial: 24 March 1301; Westminster Abbey
- Spouse: Aveline de Forz (m. 1269; died 1274) Blanche of Artois (m. 1275)
- Issue more...: Thomas, 2nd Earl of Lancaster; Henry, 3rd Earl of Lancaster
- House: Plantagenet (by birth); Lancaster (founder)
- Father: Henry III of England
- Mother: Eleanor of Provence

Edmund Crouchback (16 January 1245 – 5 June 1296) was a member of the royal Plantagenet dynasty and the founder of the House of Lancaster. He was Earl of Leicester (1265–1296), Lancaster (1267–1296) and Derby (1269–1296) in England and Count Palatine of Champagne (1276–1284) in France.

Named after the 9th-century saint, Edmund was the second surviving son of King Henry III of England and Eleanor of Provence and the younger brother of King Edward I of England, to whom he was loyal as a diplomat and warrior. In 1254, the 9-year-old Edmund became involved in the "Sicilian business", in which his father accepted a papal offer granting the Kingdom of Sicily to Edmund, who made preparations to become king. However, Henry III could not provide funds for the operation, prompting the Papacy to withdraw the grant and give it to Edmund's uncle, Charles I of Anjou. The "Sicilian business" outraged the barons led by the Earl of Leicester and Edmund's uncle, Simon de Montfort, 6th Earl of Leicester, and was cited as one of the reasons for limiting Henry's power. Deterioration of relations between the barons and the king resulted in the Second Barons' War, in which the royal government, supported by Edmund, triumphed over the baronage following the death of Montfort in the Battle of Evesham in 1265.

Edmund received the lands and titles of Montfort and the defeated barons Nicholas Segrave, 1st Baron Segrave, and Robert de Ferrers, 6th Earl of Derby, and became Earl of Lancaster, Leicester and Derby. Primarily known as the earl of the first county, he eventually became the most powerful baron of England. Later, Edmund accompanied his elder brother Edward on his crusade in the Holy Land, where his epithet "Crouchback" originated from a corruption of 'cross back', referring to him wearing a stitched cross on his garments. Following the death of his first wife, Aveline de Forz, Edmund's aunt and Dowager Queen of France Margaret of Provence arranged his second marriage to Blanche of Artois, the recently widowed Queen Dowager of Navarre and the Countess of Champagne. With his second wife Blanche, Edmund governed Champagne as count palatine in the name of his stepdaughter Joan until she came of age. Edmund was active in supporting his family members, such as assisting Edward in conquering Wales, advocating for the claims of his aunt Margaret against his uncle Charles I of Anjou in his mother and aunt's homeland of Provence and managing Ponthieu on behalf of his sister-in-law, Eleanor of Castile.

When Edmund's stepson-in-law, King Philip IV of France, demanded Edward, who was also his vassal through Gascony, to come to Paris to answer charges of damages caused by English mariners in 1293, Edward sent Edmund to mediate the crisis to avert war. Edmund negotiated an agreement with Philip where France would occupy Gascony for 40 days, and Edward would marry Philip's half-sister, Margaret. When the 40 days were over, Philip tricked Edward and Edmund by refusing to relinquish control over Gascony, calling Edward to again answer for his charges. Edmund and Edward then renounced their homages to Philip and prepared for war against France. Edmund sailed for Gascony with his army and besieged the city of Bordeaux. Unable to pay his troops, Edmund was deserted by his army and retreated to Bayonne, where he died from illness in 1296. Edmund's body was brought back to England, where he was buried in Westminster Abbey in 1301.

== Early years, 1245–1265 ==
=== Birth and childhood ===
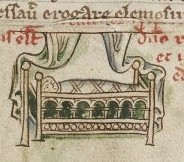
Birth of Edmund, 1245. Recorded by Matthew Paris

Edmund was born in London to King Henry III of England and Eleanor of Provence on 16 January 1245. Henry named him after the martyred and canonised 9th-century East Anglian king, whom Henry prayed to for a second son. At his birth the antiphon of Saint Edmund was repeated over and over “Oh Edmund, flower of martyrs, like a rose or a lily, pour out your prayers to the Lord for the salvation of the faithful.”

He was a younger brother of Edward (later King Edward I of England), Margaret and Beatrice, and an elder brother of Catherine. Edmund was baptised by 3 February 1245.

Edmund spent most of his childhood at Windsor Castle alongside his siblings. The queen and her young children were watched over at Windsor by her Savoyard kith and kin Bernard de Savoie and Pierre de Geneve. He grew emotionally attached to his father Henry, who rarely spent extended periods apart from his family.

=== Sicilian business ===
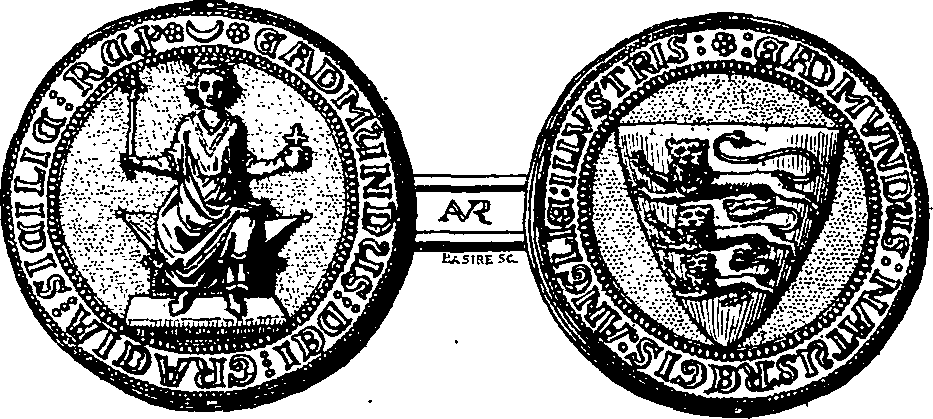
Engraving of Edmund's seal as King of Sicily granted during the "Sicilian business"

In 1254, Henry accepted a papal offer from Pope Innocent IV to make Edmund the next king of Sicily. Sicily had been ruled by Frederick II, Holy Roman Emperor, who was a rival to Innocent for many years; the papacy hoped for a friendlier ruler to succeed Frederick following his death in 1250. For Henry, Sicily was a valuable prize for his son and would also provide a base to launch his planned crusades in the east. Innocent tasked Henry with sending Edmund and an army to reclaim Sicily from Frederick's son, Manfred, King of Sicily, and to cover expenses and debts up to a total of £135,000, for which the papacy would provide assistance in funding.

The nine-year-old Edmund made preparations to become king, sailing to Gascony with his mother, Eleanor, in May 1254. In Bordeaux, on 3 October, Edmund granted his granduncle Count Thomas of Flanders the Principality of Capua before returning home in December of that year. On 18 October 1255, Edmund received a ceremonial investiture in Sicily, where his father Henry styled him as king and presented him with a ring. In April 1256, a marriage to Plaisance of Antioch, queen of Cyprus, was proposed. In April 1257, Henry paraded Edmund in Parliament dressed in Italian clothing to appeal for funds. He also suggested marrying Edmund to a daughter of Manfred to resolve the "Sicilian business" in the summer of that year.

Prospects turned grim when Pope Alexander IV succeeded Innocent and faced military pressure from the Holy Roman Empire. Alexander could no longer finance Henry's expenses and instead demanded that Henry pay £90,000 in debts to the Papacy as compensation for the war. This was an enormous sum, and Henry found himself desperate for funds. He sought assistance from Parliament, but his request was denied. Despite further attempts, Parliament only granted partial funding to Henry. Growing impatient, Alexander sent an envoy to Henry in 1258, threatening him with excommunication unless he paid his debts and sent an army to Sicily. Failing to convince Parliament further, Henry resorted to extorting money from the senior clergy, raising approximately £40,000. Subsequently, at some point between 1258 and 1263—either under Alexander or Pope Urban IV—the papacy revoked the grant of the Kingdom of Sicily to Edmund and instead bestowed the title upon Edmund's uncle, Charles I of Anjou.

=== Second Barons' War ===
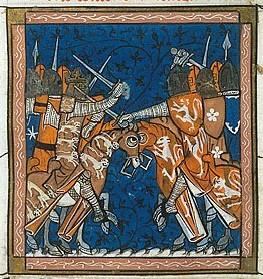
Second Barons' War between Henry III (left) and Simon de Montfort (right)

The barons, led by Edmund's uncle, Simon de Montfort, 6th Earl of Leicester, cited the 'Sicilian business' as one of their grievances against Edmund's father, King Henry III of England. This led to Henry's signing of the Provisions of Oxford in 1258, which curtailed his power as well as that of the major barons. However, Edmund collaborated with Henry and his brother Edward to overturn the Provisions in midsummer of 1262. Power in England swung back and forth between Henry and the barons, culminating in the Treaty of Kingston, under which disputes were to be resolved by Edmund's uncles, Richard of Cornwall and King Louis IX of France.

Despite the treaty, an open civil war erupted between the royal government and the radical barons led by Simon in the summer of 1263, prompting Edmund to flee from the Tower of London to Dover Castle. On 10 July, Henry wrote to Edmund and Robert de Glaston, the constable of Dover Castle, urging them to surrender the castle to the Bishop of London, Henry of Sandwich, who represented the barons, in preparation for peace negotiations. However, in a letter dated 28 July, Edmund and Robert refused to comply, arguing that surrendering the castle would go against their duties until peace was established. As a result, Henry had to personally command them to relinquish the castle.

When Simon's coalition of barons showed signs of fragmentation, Henry appealed to Louis for arbitration in the dispute, as stipulated in the Treaty of Kingston. Initially resistant to this, Simon eventually agreed to French arbitration, and representatives of Henry and Simon traveled to Paris. On 23 January 1264, Louis declared in the Mise of Amiens that Henry had the right to rule over the barons, thereby annulling the Provisions of Oxford. However, the French decision was unpopular; upon Henry's return to England unrest brewed and violence became imminent.

The Second Barons' War finally erupted in April 1264 when Henry's army occupied Simon's territories in the Midlands and advanced to reoccupy a route to France in the southeast. Accompanied by his mother, Eleanor, Edmund went to France, where he helped to raise a mercenary army, with financial assistance from his uncle Louis, to support his father. Despite Simon's capture of Henry, Richard and Edward in the Baronial victory at Lewes on 14 May, he failed to consolidate his control over England and Edward managed to escape captivity. Following the Baronial defeat at Evesham on 4 August 1265, Simon was killed and dismembered by the royal army, and his lands and title as Earl of Leicester were forfeited.

== Earl of Leicester and Lancaster, 1265–1293 ==
=== Becoming earl ===
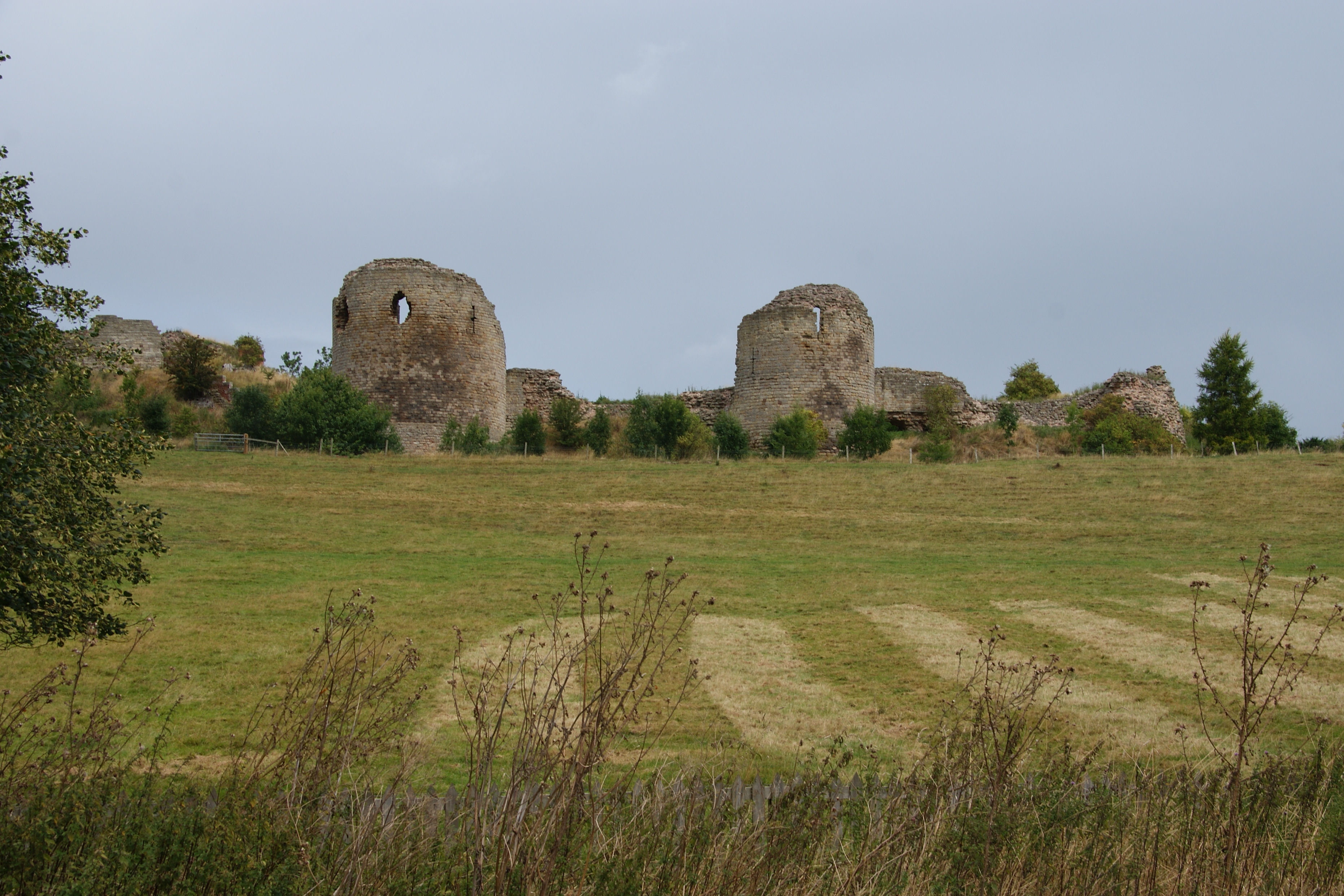
Chartley Castle in Staffordshire, one of the properties Edmund retained from the disgraced baron, Robert de Ferrers, 6th Earl of Derby

On 26 October 1265, Edmund became the Earl of Leicester when his father, King Henry III of England, granted him the title and associated lands, following the re-creation of the earldom. Additionally, he received all the lands that had belonged to Nicholas Segrave, 1st Baron Segrave, a rebel baron. Once the king's victory over the barons was assured, Edmund returned to England on 30 October 1265. As a political refugee, he harboured a desire for revenge against the barons. Alongside his brother Edward, Edmund focused on suppressing the rebel barons known as the "disinherited", whose lands had been confiscated by the royal government. On 6 December of the same year, Edmund gained control of the castles of Cardigan and Carmarthen, and on 8 January 1266, he acquired the demesnes of Dilwyn, Lugwardine, Marden, Minsterworth and Rodley.

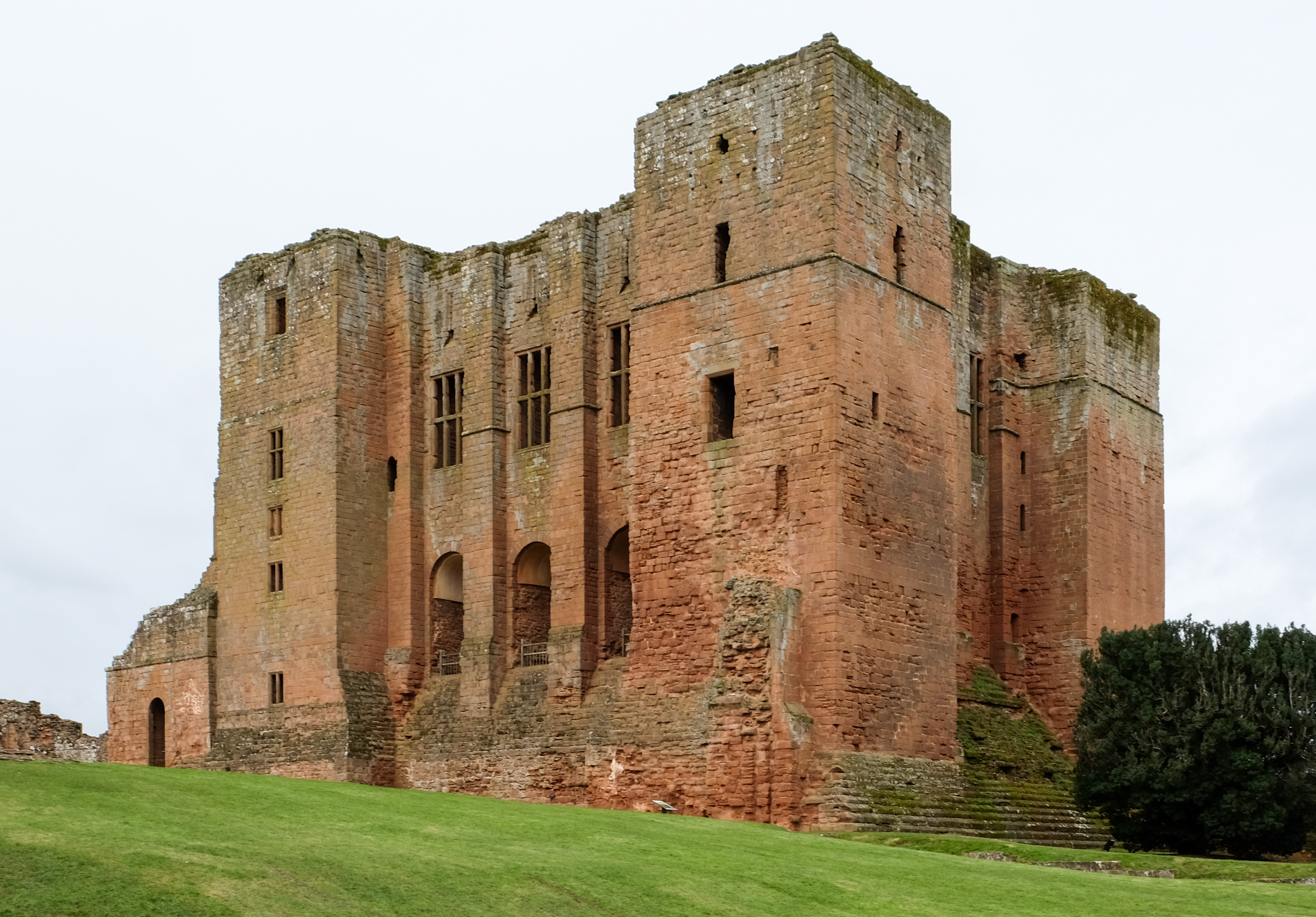
The Great Keep of Kenilworth Castle in Warwickshire. Edmund received Kenilworth Castle following the Dictum of Kenilworth, which was signed to break the six-month siege of the castle by Edmund, his brother Edward, and his father King Henry III of England.

On 28 June of the same year, Edmund acquired the forfeited estates of Robert de Ferrers, 6th Earl of Derby, whose family had held a significant feudatory since the time of Stephen, King of England. During the Second Barons' War, Robert was seen as an unreliable and violent ally to the barons, as he failed to appear promptly at the Battle of Lewes. Moreover, Robert had engaged in indiscriminate raids on lands belonging to his rival, Edward. As a result, Simon de Montfort, 6th Earl of Leicester, imprisoned him, fearing his excessive power. After receiving a pardon from Henry, Robert rebelled once again and was captured following his defeat at the Battle of Chesterfield on 15 May of that year. Edmund compelled Robert to agree that he would regain his estates upon payment of an exceedingly hefty sum, fully aware that Robert would be unable to afford such a penalty. This allowed Edmund to retain control of Robert's estates. When Edward ascended to the throne, he granted Robert's former domain of Chartley Castle to Edmund on 26 July 1276 and absolved Edmund from the debts owed by Robert and his ancestors on 5 May 1277.

During the summer of 1266, Edmund led an army in Warwick to counter the raids carried out by the rebels occupying Kenilworth Castle. The Kenilworth garrison attempted to attack Warwick, but Edmund's forces successfully repelled them back to the castle. Subsequently, the royal army besieged Kenilworth Castle, with Edmund commanding one of the four divisions alongside Henry and Edward. The siege concluded on 13 December with the implementation of the Dictum of Kenilworth, which brought peace between the king and the baronial forces by 31 October. Either in the same month or the following year, Edmund acquired Kenilworth Castle.

Since Prince Llywelyn ap Gruffudd of the Welsh Kingdom of Gwynedd was an ally of the barons, Henry dispatched Edmund, along with his Justiciar, Robert Walerand, on a diplomatic mission to negotiate peace with the prince on 21 February 1267. However, Llywelyn refused to make peace with the English until September, when Henry threatened to invade Gwynedd. Edmund continued his diplomatic activities by attending the knighting ceremony of his cousin Philip, conducted by his uncle King Louis IX of France, in Paris on 4 June. During his visit, he received the hospitality of Robert II, Count of Artois, and Robert's sister Blanche of Artois.

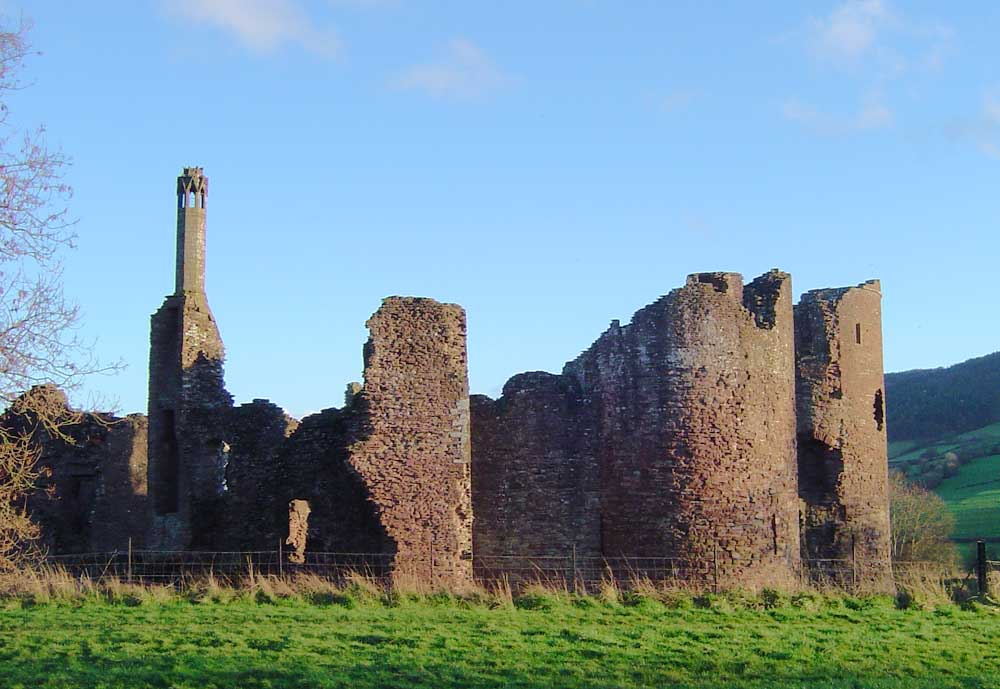
Grosmont Castle in Monmouthshire in Wales, one of the Three Castles, which Edmund received from his brother Edward.

On 30 June 1267, Edmund became the Earl of Lancaster following the title's creation by Henry, and he was granted the royal demesne lands in Lancashire, along with the lordships of Lancaster, Newcastle-under-Lyme and Pickering. Edmund was also earl of Leicester and later Derby, though he is mostly associated with the earldom of Lancaster. On the same day, Edward granted Edmund the Three Castles and Monmouth Castle in Wales. The following year, Henry appointed Edmund as the Constable of Leicester Castle, a royal possession held in the king's name. The conclusion of the Second Barons' War marked a significant turning point in Edmund's life. Although he had been disappointed by losing the Sicilian crown to his uncle Charles I of Anjou, he had now received a powerful earldom that established the Lancastrian branch of the Plantagenet dynasty. By this time, Edmund had gained a reputation as a ruthless and formidable warrior. With these acquisitions, he became the most influential peer in England. Even upon becoming king, Edward was not worried about Edmund's powerful position or the affairs of most of the baronage because of Edmund's unwavering loyalty to him.

=== First marriage and crusading ===
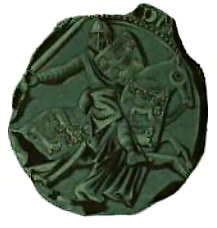
Edmund's seal (19th-century reproduction by Henri d'Arbois de Jubainville)

In the Holy Land, under the leadership of the Baibars, the Mamluks captured the city of Antioch, the last remnant of the principality that bears its namesake. The fall of the city led the papal legate of England, Ottobuono—the future Pope Adrian V—to preach for a new crusade. In an elaborate ceremony on 24 June 1268, Edmund pledged himself to undertake a crusade alongside his elder brother Edward and their cousin Henry of Almain. However, after years of civil war, the English crown had depleted its funds and could not support a crusade. Edward was forced to borrow a loan from his uncle, King Louis IX of France, who was organizing a large crusader force with the intent of invading Tunis. Despite being in a better position with his newly received earldom, Edmund hastened to marry a wealthy lady to fund the crusade.

On 20 November 1268, King Henry III of England, Edmund's father, arranged a marriage between Edmund and the recently widowed Isabel de Forz, 8th Countess of Devon. Isabel was a wealthy countess, holding the earldoms of Devon and Aumale, as well as the lordships of Holderness and the Isle of Wight. However, Edmund wanted to ensure the security of his inheritance and decided to marry Isabel's daughter, Aveline de Forz, Countess of Aumale. The marriage between Edmund and Aveline was arranged by Edmund's mother, Eleanor of Provence. On 8 or 9 April 1269, Edmund married 10-year-old Aveline, who was 14 years his junior, in Westminster Abbey; the marriage could not be consummated until she turned 14. During 1269, Edmund and his brother Edward prepared for the crusade, although they also participated in carrying the remains of Edward the Confessor to Westminster Abbey following the partial completion of the church's reconstruction by Henry on 13 October 1269. In addition, Edmund assumed the title of Earl of Derby because Robert de Ferrers, 6th Earl of Derby, was unable to fulfill his obligations. As a result, Edmund merged the title and estates of the Earldom with his Earldoms of Leicester and Lancaster.

In the summer of 1270, Edmund and Edward were delayed in joining Louis on the crusade because their father was indecisive about participating. Upon the advice of his councilors, Henry chose to remain in England, while Edward led the first group of English crusaders, setting sail from Dover on 20 August that year. The crusaders' plans failed when an epidemic broke out in their camp, killing Louis on 25 August. Edward arrived at Tunis on 10 November 1270, but it was too late to engage in battle due to the Treaty of Tunis, which had been signed on 30 October. As a result, most of the crusaders returned home.

Between 25 February and 4 March 1271, Edmund embarked for the Holy Land, leaving his mother Eleanor in charge of his estates. We know a little of Edmund’s route from the Savoyard archives in Turin which places Edmund in Saint-Georges-d'Espéranche in August 1271. Edmund was the guest of his maternal great uncle Philip I, Count of Savoy and likely met his master mason James of Saint George who would soon build castles in Wales for Edward. This is the first meeting of royal family with their future castle builder.

Meanwhile, Edward had already set off on a crusade to Palestine to support Bohemund VI of Antioch, and arrived in Acre on 9 May 1271. In September 1271, Edmund arrived with a larger army, reinforced by King Hugh III of Cyprus, to assist his brother. Despite some successes, such as the raid on Qaqun—where the crusaders reportedly killed one thousand Turkomans—the seizure of numerous cattle and the repulsion of several Mamluk attacks, the limited size of the crusader forces compelled Hugh to sign a 10 year truce with Baibars in May 1272, much to Edward's dismay. With the crusade coming to an end, Edmund returned to England around 6 December, where he was greeted by jubilant crowds in London. However, Edmund's crusade proved futile and incurred significant expenses.

Historians Peter Heylyn and Simon Lloyd believe that Edumund received his epithet 'Crouchback' during the crusade, suggesting it as a corruption of 'crossback', as Edmund wore a cross stitched into the back of his garments while on the crusade. In 1394, John of Gaunt, the founder of the second House of Lancaster and the husband of Edmund's great-granddaughter Blanche of Lancaster, interpreted the epithet differently, believing that Edmund was a hunchback. According to chronicler John Hardyng, John would forge chronicles to assert that Edmund was the elder brother and not Edward, claiming that the crown passed over him due to his physical deformity. However, Roger Mortimer, 4th Earl of March, presented evidence countering these claims, stating that the chronicles described Edmund as a handsome knight who was skilled in combat.

=== Second marriage to Blanche of Artois ===
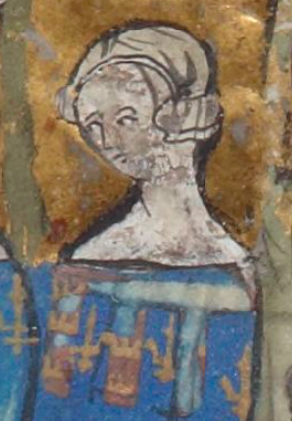
Blanche of Artois, Edmund's second wife, 1285

Edmund's father King Henry III of England died on 16 November 1272, and Edmund's elder brother Edward was proclaimed king. However, Edward was on his way back to England from the Holy Land and his journey was slow, as Edward had to negotiate with King Philip III of France about several claims and put down a Gascon revolt. A rumour spread that Edward was never going to return to England, leading to a growing rebellion in the northern part of the country. Edmund then dispersed the rebels with Roger Mortimer, 1st Baron Mortimer of Wigmore. In 1273, Edmund's wife Aveline turned fourteen and Edmund consummated his marriage with her.

Edward returned to England on 2 August 1274, and he was crowned King Edward I of England on 19 August 1274. Edmund succeeded him as Lord High Steward of England the following day. On 10 November 1274, Aveline suddenly died, leaving Edmund with no children and dashing his hopes to inherit Aveline's titles and earldoms. Edmund's maternal aunt and the Queen Dowager of France Margaret of Provence wanted to secure a wealthy bride for her nephew not only for familial reasons, but to convince Edmund's brother Edward to support her claims to Provence against Charles I of Anjou, King of Sicily.

Margaret pushed for the marriage of Edmund and Blanche of Artois, Queen Dowager of Navarre and widow of King Henry I of Navarre, and the Countess of the wealthy and powerful County of Champagne and Brie, which made up more than Edmund's lost possessions. Blanche accepted the match because she needed a second husband who was congenial to King Philip III of France—who was Edmund's cousin—to help manage Champagne with her. However, the chronicler John of Trokelowe reported that Edmund and Blanche had also known of each others' reputations as a chivalrous knight and a skilled and beautiful regent, respectively, and they became mutually attracted to each other. indeed the couple likely first met in July 1267 in Paris when Edmund was a guest of Blanche’s brother Robert II, Count of Artois. Nonetheless Robert was furious upon hearing about their engagement, believing the English to still be hostile to France. Edward, meanwhile, was neutral toward the couple's betrothal, seeing it as nothing more than an additional familial link with his French relatives.

On 6 August 1275, Edmund received a writ of protection to travel overseas from England to France to meet his bride. Between December 1275 and January 1276 in Paris, Edmund married Blanche, three years his junior, and thus became a stepfather to Blanche's daughter Joan. In the name of Joan, Edmund became the count palatine of Champagne and would govern the County along with his wife until Joan reached the age of majority. In January 1276, Edmund paid homage to Philip III, becoming his vassal. The kings of France struggled in controlling Champagne as a vassal until Joan's betrothal to Philip the Fair, the son of Philip III, which allowed Philip III to fully control the county. Due to his commitments elsewhere, Edmund could only administer Champagne intermittently, with the Grand Butler of France John II of Brienne serving in his absence. In June, Edmund brought Blanche to England to see his English possessions and in July he made a journey to his wife's kingdom of Navarre, around the same time Blanche's brother Robert was pacifying the region.

=== Commander at Wales and diplomat ===
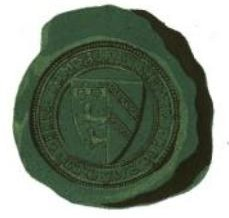
Seal depicting Edmund's coat of arms as Count Palatine of Champagne

Following the deterioration of relations between England and Gwynedd, Edmund's brother King Edward I of England declared war in November 1276. In early 1277, Edmund was summoned to return to England by Edward, along with other English nobles, to proceed against the Prince of Wales, Llywelyn ap Gruffudd. Edmund succeeded Payne de Chaworth as capitaneus of the royal forces in South Wales in April and launched military operations against the Welsh alongside Roger Mortimer and William de Beauchamp, 9th Earl of Warwick. Payne had previously had success in the valley of the River Towy, capturing the castles of Dryslywn, Dinefwr, Carreg Cennan and Llandovery, allowing Edmund, who assumed his command, to push further north, seizing the lands of the Welsh noble Rhys ab Maelgwyn and taking Aberystwyth at the end of July 1277. Edmund assigned his troops to rebuild Aberystwyth Castle, then known as Llanbadarn Castle, and returned to England on 20 September, assigning Roger Myles as constable of the castle. The war ended with the Treaty of Aberconwy in November 1277, with Gwynedd surrendering and ceding control over his vassals and conquered territories.

In 1278, Edmund travelled to his dominion of Champagne to administer the county, after which he returned to England to approve and attend the wedding of Llywelyn and his cousin Eleanor de Montfort, the daughter of Simon de Montfort, 6th Earl of Leicester, in Worcester. In the same year, Edmund's wife Blanche gave birth to their son Thomas, who became heir to the Earldom of Lancaster and all of Edmund's domains. The next year, Edward appointed Edmund to be Ambassador to France to negotiate with their cousin King Philip III of France regarding the English claims on the Counties of Agenais and Quercy as part of the dowry of Edmund and Edward's grand-aunt Joan of England, which were under the control of Alphonse, Count of Poitiers.

Since Alphonse died without issue, according to the Treaty of Abbeville of 1259 signed between England and France, the counties as part of Joan's dowry were to be returned to the English crown. Edmund signed a treaty with Philip in May 1279, with Philip renouncing his 1275 oath of allegiance to the vassals of Aquitaine and ceding only Agenais to the English, as he did not believe Quercy to be a part of Joan's dowry. In addition, with the approval of Philip, Edmund started governing the County of Ponthieu alongside his brother-in-law (through his sister Beatrice) Duke John II of Brittany on behalf of his sister-in-law Eleanor of Castile, who inherited the County as Countess following the death of her mother Joan of Dammartin in 1279.

=== Count of Champagne ===
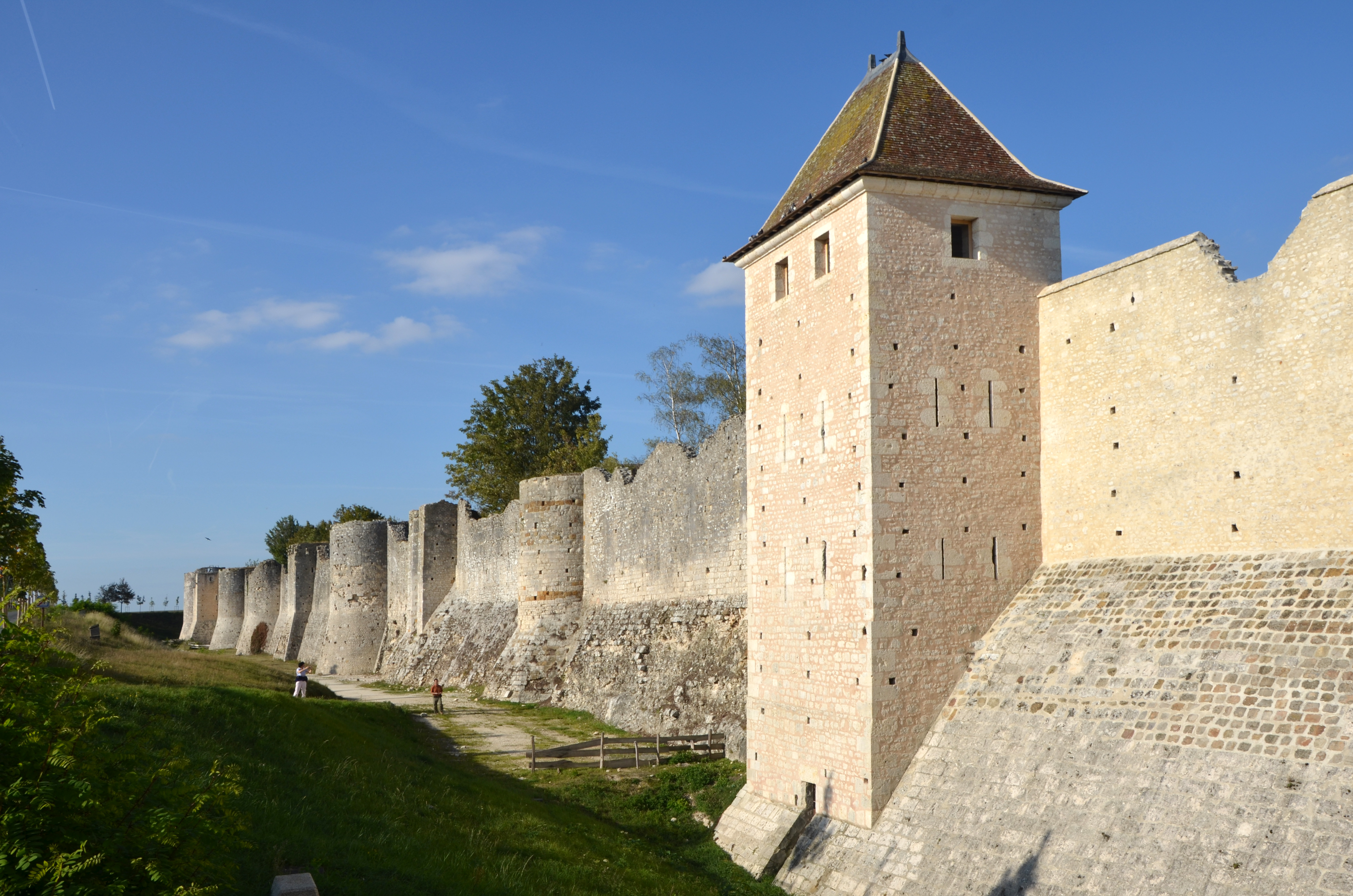
Ramparts of Provins in France

In January 1280, a mob formed in Provins, the capital of Brie and also part of the County of Champagne, following the implementation of an unpopular tax, and installed Gilbert de Morry as mayor, killing the previous mayor William Pentecost. Edmund and the Grand Butler of France John II of Brienne marched to Provins with an army, and the leaders of the mob fled, leaving the gates open. Edmund and John forfeited the town's privileges and authorities, disarmed the inhabitants of Provins and condemned the leaders of the mob to death or banishment, with Gilbert being excommunicated. John was more ruthless in punishing the inhabitants of Provins than Edmund; according to a chronicler of the abbey of Saint-Magloire, John ordered hangings, beheadings and mutilations. Edmund went back to visit his estates in England following his chastisement of Provins.

Edmund returned to France and pardoned the town of Provins in July 1281 through the meditation of several church officials and Gilles de Brion, the grand mayor of Donnemarie and brother of Pope Martin IV. Edmund returned privileges to the town, and allowed the inhabitants of Provins to build new fountains, acquire buildings for their courts and establish a bell to mark the work hours and curfew; in exchange, he enacted a harsh tax on the town. The prosperity of Provins soon declined, in contrast to Leicester, a town in Edmund's English domains that saw major growth during his reign. In the same year, Blanche gave birth to Edmund's second son Henry, whose son Henry of Grosmont would eventually become a powerful leader of England during the Hundred Years' War.

In the autumn of 1281, Edmund, as Count Palatine of Champagne, joined forces in Mâcon in October with Philip I of Savoy, Robert II of Burgundy, Otto IV of Burgundy and other nobles to support the claims of his aunt Margaret of Provence to her homeland of Provence against his uncle Charles I of Anjou, who had solidified his control over the region and was unwilling to negotiate. Edmund and the nobles assembled their forces at Lyon in May 1282 to invade Provence, but the eruption of the Sicilian Vespers forced Charles to rent out Provence to Margaret, averting war..That same month, Edmund heard that Wales had launched a war against England, and returned to England to command the English army in South Wales. The Prince of Wales Llywelyn ap Gruffudd retreated southwards when Edward's army pressed hard in North Wales, but a detachment of Edmund's army lured Llywelyn into a trap and killed him in the Battle of Orewin Bridge on 11 December 1282. Edward finalized his conquest of Wales through the capture of Llywelyn's brother Dafydd ap Gruffydd in June 1283, who succeeded Llywelyn as Prince of Wales in December.

=== Ceding Champagne and managing England ===
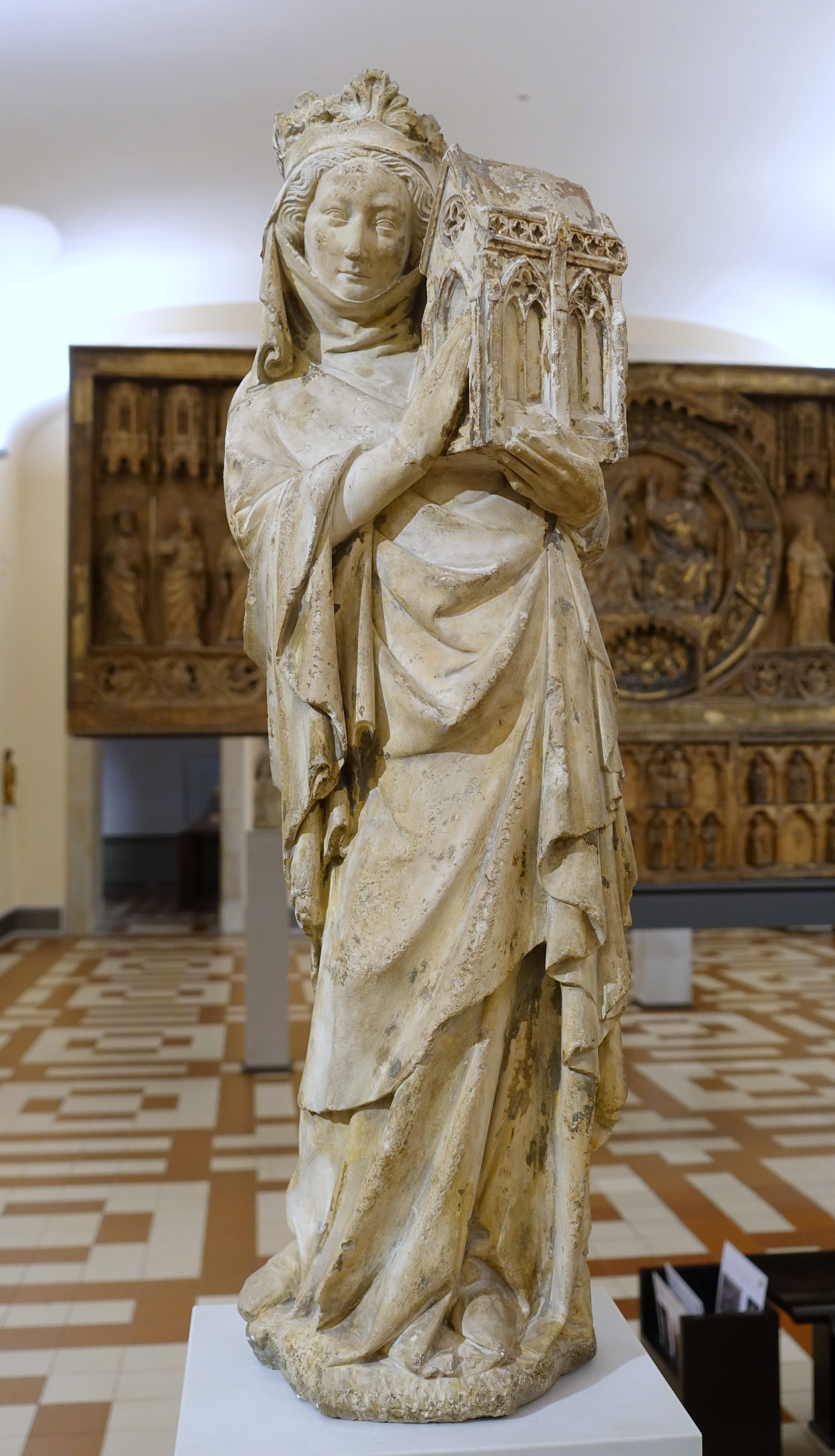
Edmund's stepdaughter Joan I of Navarre

As Joan, his stepdaughter, approached the age of 11, the age of majority in France, Edmund debated with his cousin King Philip III of France about whether Joan would still be under his guardianship until she turned 21, in accordance with the laws of Champagne. This would have allowed him to attain management and revenue of the county for a longer duration. For three months, Edmund would query on Joan's age of majority until he finally yielded.

When Joan reached the age of majority on 14 January 1284, Philip III compromised with Edmund's wife Blanche of Artois on 17 May via a treaty, allowing her to keep several of her dowerlands—the castles of Sézanne, Chantemerle, Nogent-sur-Seine, Pont-sur-Seine and Vertus, and the Palace of Navarrese Kings in Paris—and paying 60 to 70 thousand livres tournois to Edmund and Blanche. In addition, Philip relinquished any claim to half of the property acquired and held jointly by Blanche and her first husband King Henry I of Navarre in Champagne, and extended this renouncement to Edmund.

Following the marriage of Joan and Prince Philip the Fair, Philip III's son, on 16 August 1284, Edmund renounced the title of Count Palatine of Champagne and ceded control of all of the county except his wife's dowerlands to Philip the Fair. Edmund and Blanche's last son, John, was born in May 1286. For the rest of the 1280s, Edmund oversaw the affairs of his lands, such as hiring a chaplain for Tutbury Castle, but also accompanied his brother King Edward I of England when he stayed in Gascony for almost three years. His likely return to England a little earlier than Edward and by a direct sea route rather than by way of Ponthieu as did Edward is possibly indicated by a record of 26th June 1289 whereby he granted the maintenance of a lamp “burning day and night in the church of Saint Mary, before the altar of the holy cross” that is in Monmouth Priory.

Edward inherited the County of Ponthieu following the death of his wife Eleanor of Castile on 28 November 1290. On 23 April 1291, due to Edmund's experience in managing his French domains, Edward granted Ponthieu to Edmund, which he was to administer until Edward's son Edward of Caernarfon gained the age of majority. During the assembly at Norham on 13 June 1291 to select the next King of Scotland, Edmund witnessed the submission of rival claims to the Scottish crown under Edward's arbitration. Edmund also observed the claimants' pledges to accept his brother's decision and witnessed the Scottish nobility swearing fealty to Edward as their overlord.

On 5 February 1292, Edmund was chosen as part of a five-member commission with full authority to establish and enforce regulations to uphold the use of arms in the kingdom. During the same year, he also provided bail for Gilbert de Clare, 7th Earl of Gloucester, when he was involved in a private war with Humphrey de Bohun, 3rd Earl of Hereford, regarding their rights and privileges as Marcher lords. In 1293, Edmund founded the Abbey of the Minoresses of St. Clare without Aldgate, a convent for the Order of Poor Clares, outside Aldgate. Blanche, his wife, facilitated the arrival of the first nuns to the convent from France. Due to the high rank of Edmund and Blanche in society, the Abbey grew more rapidly than any other Minoresses house in England. Edmund also played a role in establishing a Greyfriars priory at Preston, located in his earldom of Lancaster.

== Last years, 1293–1296 ==
=== Crisis with France ===
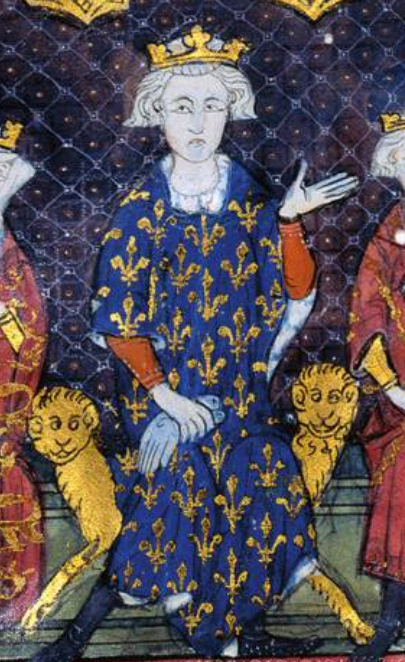
King Philip IV of France, Edmund's stepson-in-law through his stepdaughter Joan and his cousin first removed through his cousin King Philip III of France

The cordial relationship between England and France soured intensely when English mariners of the Cinque Ports defeated the Norman fleet off of Brittany in 15 May 1293 and the Bayonnais afterwards sacked the port of La Rochelle in Poitiers. Edmund's stepson-in-law and first cousin once removed, King Philip IV of France, was outraged and demanded that Edmund's brother King Edward I of England deliver the offenders and pay for damages, threatening to confiscate the English-held vassal of Gascony and imprison many of its influential citizens. On 27 October 1293, Philip IV formally summoned Edward to come to Paris in person to answer for the charges against him in January 1294. The French, especially followers of Philip's brother, Count Charles of Valois, wanted France to annex the Duchy of Aquitaine, which comprises Gascony, believing that Edward wanted war.

Edward did not want war and wanted to show his respect to Philip as his vassal, and sent Edmund and some ambassadors to Paris to negotiate with Philip. Edmund left England for France between the end of 1293 and the beginning of 1294, bringing his wife Blanche with him. In Paris, Edmund was unsuccessful in negotiating a compromise with Philip, until Philip's wife and Edmund's stepdaughter through Blanche, Queen Joan I of Navarre, and his cousin-in-law Queen Dowager of France Marie of Brabant offered to intervene on Edmund's behalf. The private conversation between the queens and the English envoys was cordial and easy-going, with the queens assuring Philip.

The English made a secret agreement with Philip: in exchange for Edward's citation being withdrawn, Edward would marry Philip's half-sister Margaret and France would occupy Gascony for 40 days. To arrange the marriage, Edward was to come under safe conduct to Amiens in the week before or after Easter of 1294, following the 40 days of occupation. Edmund, satisfied with the agreement, ordered John St John, the Lieutenant of Gascony, to hand Gascony over to the French, but not before receiving a personal assurance from Philip, in front of an audience including the English envoys, Blanche and Duke Robert II of Burgundy, that he would honor his agreement. After hearing rumours of French betrayal and that Margaret would not accept him as a husband, Edward decided not to visit France, much to Philip's anger.

When the 40 days expired, Edmund and the English envoys asked that Gascony be returned to Edward and the citation be withdrawn. Philip reassured them that they should not be alarmed, as he planned to give a negative answer in public because he did not want to refuse some of his council members who opposed restoring Gascony to English control. The English asked if they could attend the council meeting, but they were refused, and they waited anxiously for Philip's response. Once the meeting was completed, the bishops of Orléans and Tournai told the English envoys that France would keep Gascony and that Philip would not change his mind. Finally, on 21 April, in a parlement session overseen by Philip, Edward was cited again to appear in Paris with no safe conduct granted nor delay allowed. Historian Michael Prestwich believes that the French queens were likely acting in good faith in representing Edmund's interests, but that they and Edmund had overestimated their influence on Philip.

=== War in France ===
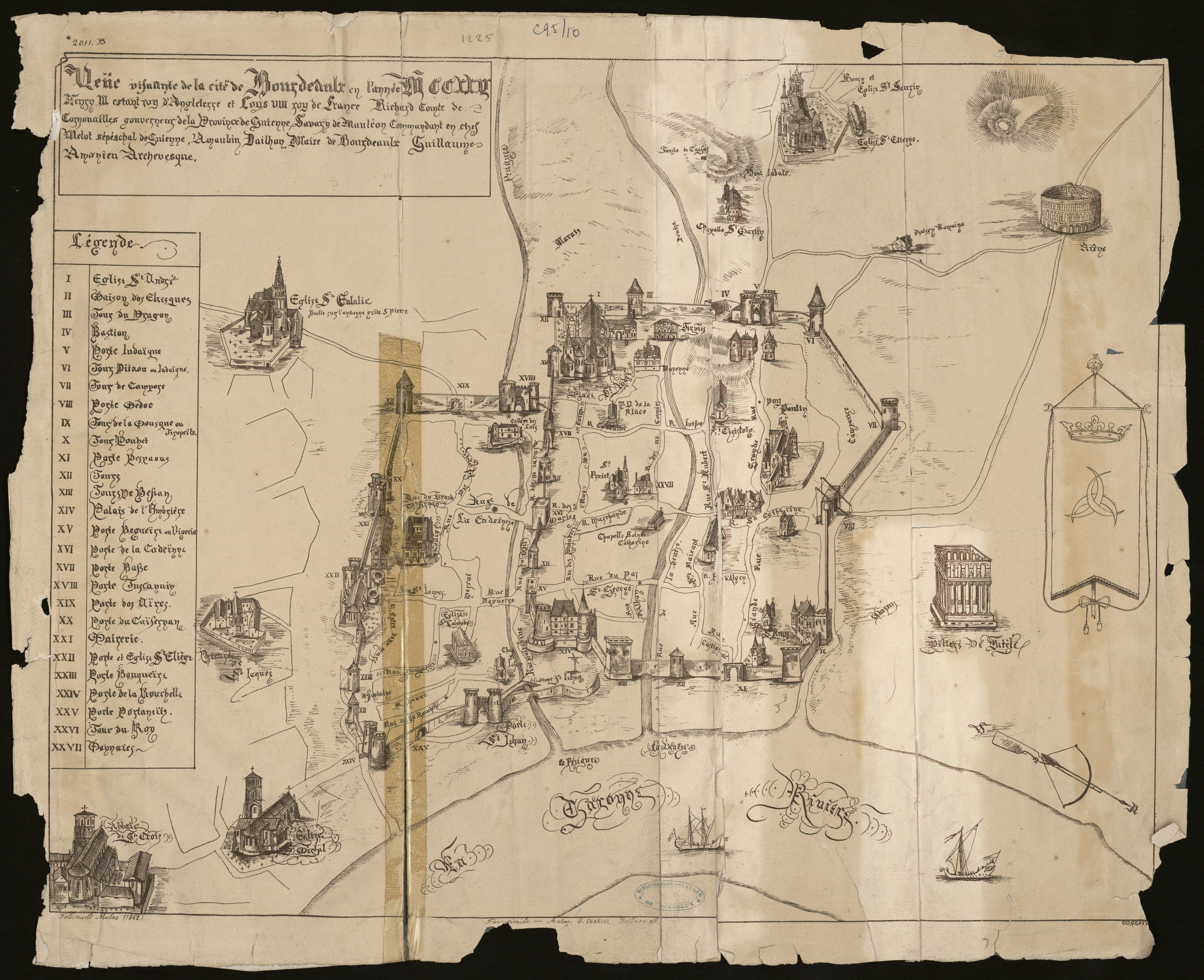
A map of Bordeaux in 1229, where Edmund launched his siege

Upon hearing the decision on his brother King Edward I of England, Edmund renounced his homage to King Philip IV of France, and with his wife Blanche of Artois, sold a part of her dowerlands to an abbey. The couple returned to England with all of their English household and John of Brittany, who had also renounced his homage to Philip. Edward formally renounced his homage to Philip and the English baronage prepared for war. On 1 July 1294, Edward wrote to his administrators in Gascony, apologizing for the secret treaty and stating that he would send Edmund and the Earl of Lincoln Henry de Lacy to reclaim Gascony. On 3 September, he ordered the Cinque Ports to provide shipping for Edmund's voyage. Following the suppression of a Welsh rebellion, Edmund and his envoys explained the causes of the war to a council of magnates on 5 August 1295. Edmund was among the loudest of the nobles in their cries for war.

Edmund planned to launch his expedition to Gascony in October, but fell ill that autumn and did not depart England until the winter. With his expedition, he brought his wife Blanche, Earl Henry de Lacy, 26 knights bannerets and 1,700 men-at-arms. The English prince landed in Pointe Saint-Mathieu in Brittany, sending messengers that they would rest there for several days. The Bretons responded by hanging the messengers, resulting in Edmund's forces looting the countryside. English soldiers also looted the Abbey of Saint-Mathieu de Fine-Terre, although Edmund ordered them to return all stolen valuables. The English army then arrived at Brest, where they received supplies, and sailed down to Blaye and later Castillon, where they landed their forces.

The castle of Lesparre surrendered to Edmund's forces on 22 March 1296 and Edmund launched his siege of Bordeaux with his encampment in Bègles in the south. On 28 March, the Bordeaux garrison attempted to surprise the English encampment, but realized that the English were waiting for them and hastily retreated back to the city, sustaining many casualties. On 30 March, the English broke into the outer wall of Bordeaux, but did not have siege engines to break through the city's inner walls. Hearing that his brother-in-law Robert II, Count of Artois, was in command of a French army at Langon, Edmund and his army left Bordeaux to meet him. Edmund did not find his brother-in-law there and the village there surrendered to him. Edmund then launched a siege of the castle in nearby Saint-Macaire, alerting Robert to send his forces to relieve the castle. Realizing his funds were low, Edmund returned to Bordeaux to siege the city.

=== Death and burial ===
During the siege of Bourdeaux, Edmund ran out of money to pay his army and his mercenaries deserted him. Edmund and his remaining forces then travelled to Bayonne, where he was warmly received, although the failure of his campaign troubled him. The English prince fell sick on 13 May 1296 and died on 5 June. In his will, Edmund instructed that his body should not be buried until his debts were paid. Edmund's remains were embalmed and initially kept at the church of the Friars Minors in Bayonne. After six months, they were transferred to the Convent of the Minoresses in London. On 17 November 1296, Edmund's widow, Blanche of Artois, obtained safe conduct for her return to England. In 1298, she received a third of Edmund's estates as part of her dowry. On 24 March 1301, Edmund's body was transported to St Paul's Cathedral and later moved to Westminster Abbey, where it was laid to rest in an elaborate tomb near the resting place of Edmund's first wife, Aveline de Forz.

== Family ==
Coat of arms of Edmund Crouchback and the House of Lancaster

=== Issue ===
Edmund's first wife Aveline de Forz died before the couple could have any children.

By his second wife Blanche of Artois, Edmund had four children. Of these, all three of his sons outlived their father. Edmund's children with Blanche were:

- Thomas (b. c. 1278 – 22 March 1322)
- Henry (b. c. 1281 – 22 September 1345)
- John, Lord of Beaufort (b. bef. May 1286 – 13 June 1317)
- Mary, no dates were recorded, presumably died young in France

Through his marriage to Blanche of Artois, Edmund also became stepfather to Queen Joan I of Navarre.

=== Ancestry and family tree ===
Ancestors of Edmund Crouchback

8. Henry II, King of England
4. John, King of England
9. Eleanor, Duchess of Aquitaine
2. Henry III, King of England
10. Aymer, Count of Angoulême
5. Isabella, Countess of Angoulême
11. Alice of Courtenay
1. Edmund Crouchback
12. Alfonso II, Count of Provence
6. Ramon Berenguer IV, Count of Provence
13. Garsenda, Countess of Forcalquier
3. Eleanor of Provence
14. Thomas I, Count of Savoy
7. Beatrice of Savoy
15. Margaret of Geneva

Peerage family tree of the Dukes of Beaufort, Lancaster, and Somerset and subsidiary titles

Earl of Dorset (possibly 1st creation), 1070
Roger de Beaumont c. 1015–1094	Saint Osmund d. 1099; Bishop of Salisbury and possibly Earl of Dorset
Earl of Dorset (1st creation) discontinued, 1099
Earl of Leicester (1st creation), 1107
King Henry I c. 1068–1135	King Stephen; 1092/1096–1154	Robert de Beaumont c. 1040/1050–1118; 1st Earl of Leicester	Henry de Beaumont d. 1119; Earl of Warwick
Earl of Worcester (1st creation), 1138
Robert FitzRoy c. 1090–1147; Earl of Gloucester	Matilda (d. bef. 1141)	Waleran de Beaumont; 1104–1166; Earl of Worcester	Robert de Beaumont; 1104–1168; 2nd Earl of Leicester	Hugh de Beaumont b. 1106; Earl of Bedford
Earldom of Worcester (1st creation) extinct, 1166
William FitzRobert; 1116–1183; Earl of Gloucester	Hawise de Beaumont	Robert de Beaumont d. 1190; 3rd Earl of Leicester
Robert de Beaumont d. 1204; 4th Earl of Leicester	Amice; Countess of Rochefort
King John; 1166–1216	Isabella; 1173/1174–1217; Countess of Gloucester	Simon de Montfort c. 1175–1218; 5th Earl of Leicester
King Henry III; 1207–1272	Eleanor of England	Simon de Montfort c. 1208–1265; 6th Earl of Leicester
Earldom of Leicester (1st creation) forfeited, 1265
Earl of Leicester (2nd creation), 1267; Earl of Lancaster, 1276
King Edward I 1239–1307	Edmund Crouchback; 1245–1296; 1st Earl of Leicester, 1st Earl of Lancaster
Earldom of Leicester (2nd creation) restored, 1324; Earldom of Lancaster restored, 1327
King Edward II; 1284–1327	Thomas of Lancaster; 1278–1322; 2nd Earl of Leicester, 2nd Earl of Lancaster	Henry of Lancaster; 1281–1345; 3rd Earl of Leicester, 3rd Earl of Lancaster
Earldom of Leicester (2nd creation) and Earldom of Lancaster forfeited, 1322
Duke of Lancaster, 1351
King Edward III; 1312–1377	Henry of Grosmont c. 1310–1361; Duke of Lancaster, 4th Earl of Lancaster, 4th Earl of Leicester	Joan of Lancaster c. 1312–1349 m. John (II) de Mowbray; 1310–1361; Baron Mowbray	Eleanor of Lancaster; 1318–1372	Mary of Lancaster c. 1320–1362
Earl of Worcester (2nd creation), 1397
John of Gaunt; 1340–1399; Duke of Lancaster, 5th Earl of Lancaster, (6th) Earl of Leicester jure uxoris Earl of Richmond	Blanche of Lancaster; 1342–1368; 5th Countess of Lancaster, (6th) Countess of Leicester	Maud of Lancaster; 1340–1362 a.k.a. Matilda, Countess of Hainault	William; 1330–1389; Duke of Bavaria and Count of Holland, (5th) Earl of Leicester jure uxoris	Richard Fitzalan; 1346–1397; Earl of Arundel	Thomas Percy; 1343–1403; Earl of Worcester
Earldom of Worcester (2nd creation) extinct, 1403
Eleanor Mowbray d. bef. 1387 m. Roger La Warr; 1326–1370
Earl of Somerset (1st creation), 1397; Marquess of Somerset and Marquess of Dorset (1st creation), 1397	Earl of Dorset (2nd creation), 1411
Henry Bolingbroke; 1367–1413; Duke of Lancaster, (7th) Earl of Leicester later King Henry IV	John Beaufort c. 1373–1410; Marquess of Somerset, Marquess of Dorset, 1st Earl of Somerset	Thomas Beaufort c. 1377–1426; Duke of Exeter, Earl of Dorset	Joan Beaufort c. 1379–1440	Joan La Warr m. Thomas West; 1365–1405; Baron West	Joan de Beauchamp; 1375–1435
Earldom of Leicester (2nd creation) and Dukedom of Lancaster merged into the Crown, 1399	Marquessate of Somerset and Marquessate of Dorset (1st creation) revoked, 1399	Earldom of Dorset (2nd creation) extinct, 1426
Duke of Lancaster, 1399	Earl of Worcester (3rd creation), 1421
Henry of Monmouth; 1386–1422; Duke of Lancaster later King Henry V	Richard Beauchamp; 1394–c. 1422; Earl of Worcester	Reginald West; 1395–1450; Baron De La Warr and Baron West
Dukedom of Lancaster merged into the Crown, 1413	Earldom of Worcester (3rd creation) extinct, 1422
Duke of Somerset (1st creation), 1443	Earl of Dorset (3rd creation), 1442; Marquess of Dorset (2nd creation), 1443; Duke of Somerset (2nd creation), 1448
Henry Beaufort; 1401–1418; 2nd Earl of Somerset	John Beaufort; 1404–1444; 1st Duke of Somerset, 3rd Earl of Somerset	Edmund Beaufort; 1406–1455; 2nd Duke of Somerset, 1st Marquess of Dorset, etc., 4th Earl of Somerset	Richard Neville; 1400–1460; Earl of Salisbury	Edward Neville d. 1476; Baron Bergavenny	Elizabeth Beauchamp; 1415–1448	Richard West; 1430–1476; Baron De La Warr, Baron West
Dukedom of Somerset (1st creation) extinct, 1444
Claimed titles here are disputed	Earl of Worcester (4th creation), 1449
Margaret Beaufort; 1443–1509	Elizabeth Woodville c. 1437–1492	Henry Beaufort; 1436–1464; 3rd Duke of Somerset, 2nd Marquess of Dorset, 5th Earl of Dorset	Edmund Beaufort c. 1438–1471; 4th Duke of Somerset, 3rd Marquess of Dorset, 6th Earl of Dorset	Cecily Neville c. 1425–1450	John Tiptoft; 1427–1470; 1st Earl of Worcester
Dukedom of Somerset (2nd creation), Marquessate of Dorset (2nd creation), and Earldom of Dorset attained, 1461, but possibly restored (disputed), 1463	Dukedom of Somerset (2nd creation), Marquessate of Dorset (2nd creation), and Earldom of Dorset extinct, 1471	Earldom of Worcester (4th creation) attainted, 1470
Thomas West c. 1457–1525; Baron De La Warr, Baron West
Marquess of Dorset (3rd creation), 1475	Earl of Worcester (5th creation), 1514	Earl of Worcester (4th creation) restored, 1471
Margery Wentworth c. 1478–1550	King Henry VII; 1457–1509	Elizabeth of York; 1466–1503	Thomas Grey; 1451–1501; 1st Marquess of Dorset	Charles Somerset c. 1460–1526; 1st Earl of Worcester	Elizabeth Somerset c. 1476–1507; 3rd Baroness Herbert suo jure	Edward Tiptoft c. 1469–1485; 2nd Earl of Worcester	Eleanor West b. 1481 m. Edward Guildford c. 1474–1534
Earldom of Worcester (4th creation) extinct, 1485
Viscount Beauchamp "of Hache" (1st creation), 1536; Earl of Hertford (2nd creation), 1537; Duke of Somerset (4th creation), 1547	Duke of Somerset (3rd creation), 1499
Edward Seymour c. 1500–1552; Duke of Somerset, Earl of Hertford, etc.	Jane Seymour c. 1508–1537	King Henry VIII; 1491–1547	Thomas Grey; 1477–1530; 2nd Marquess of Dorset	Henry Somerset c. 1495–1548; 2nd Earl of Worcester, 4th Baron Herbert	Mary Tudor; 1496–1533; Queen of France; Duchess of Suffolk	Edmund Tudor; 1499–1500; 1st Duke of Somerset	Jane Guildford c. 1508/1509–1555 m. John Dudley; 1504–1553; Duke of Northumberland
Dukedom of Somerset (4th creation), Earldom of Hertford (2nd creation), and Viscountcy Beauchamp (1st creation) forfeit, 1552	Dukedom of Somerset (3rd creation) extinct, 1500
Duke of Richmond and Somerset, 1525
King Edward VI; 1537–1553	Henry Fitzroy; 1519–1536; 1st Duke of Richmond and Somerset	Henry Grey; 1517–1554; Duke of Suffolk, 3rd Marquess of Dorset	Frances Brandon; 1517–1559; Duchess of Suffolk
Dukedom of Richmond and Somerset extinct, 1536	Marquessate of Dorset (3rd creation) attainted and honours forfeit, 1554
Earl of Hertford (3rd creation) and Viscount Beauchamp "of Hache" (2nd creation), 1559	Earl of Leicester (3rd creation), 1564	Baron Buckhurst (1st creation), 1567; Earl of Dorset (4th creation), 1604
Edward Seymour c. 1528–1593	Edward Seymour; 1539–1621; Earl of Hertford, etc.	Katherine Grey; 1540–1568	William Somerset c. 1526–1589; 3rd Earl of Worcester, 5th Baron Herbert	John Dudley c. 1527–1554; Earl of Warwick	Robert Dudley; 1532–1588; 1st Earl of Leicester	Mary Dudley c. 1530–1586 m. Henry Sidney	Guildford Dudley c. 1535–1554	Jane Grey; 1537–1554; Disputed Queen of England	Thomas Sackville; 1536–1608; 1st Earl of Dorset, etc.
Earldom of Hertford (3rd creation) forfeit, 1552	Earldom of Leicester (3rd creation) extinct, 1588
Seymour baronets, of Berry Pomeroy, 1611	Earl of Leicester (4th creation), 1618
Edward Seymour c. 1563–1613; 1st Baronet	Edward Seymour; 1561–1612; Viscount Beauchamp	Edward Somerset; 1553–1628; 4th Earl of Worcester, 6th Baron Herbert	Philip Sidney; 1554–1586	Mary Sidney; 1561–1621	Robert Sidney; 1563–1626; 1st Earl of Leicester	Robert Sackville; 1561–1609; 2nd Earl of Dorset, etc.
Marquess of Hertford (1st creation), 1641; Duke of Somerset (4th creation restored), 1660	Baron Seymour of Trowbridge, 1641	Marquess of Worcester, 1642	Viscount Somerset of Cashel, 1626	Viscount Rochester, 1611; Earl of Somerset (3rd creation), 1613
Edward Seymour c. 1580–1659; 2nd Baronet	William Seymour; 1588–1660; 2nd Duke of Somerset, 1st Marquess of Hertford, 2nd Earl of Hertford	Francis Seymour c. 1590–1664; 1st Lord Seymour of Trowbridge	Henry Somerset; 1577–1646; 1st Marquess of Worcester, 5th Earl of Worcester, 7th Baron Herbert	Thomas Somerset; 1579–1651; Viscount Somerset	Robert Sidney; 1595–1677; 2nd Earl of Leicester	Richard Sackville; 1589–1624; 3rd Earl of Dorset, etc.	Edward Sackville; 1591–1652; 4th Earl of Dorset, etc.	Robert Carr c. 1587–1645; Earl of Somerset, etc.
Viscountcy Somerset extinct, 1651	Earldom of Somerset (3rd creation) and Viscountcy Rochester extinct, 1645
Edward Seymour; 1610–1688; 3rd Baronet	Henry Seymour c. 1626–1654; Lord Beauchamp	Charles Seymour c. 1621–1665; 2nd Lord Seymour of Trowbridge	Edward Somerset; 1601–1667; 2nd Marquess of Worcester, 6th Earl of Worcester, 8th Baron Herbert	Philip Sidney; 1619–1698; 3rd Earl of Leicester	Algernon Sidney; 1623–1683	Lucy Sidney; 1630–1685	Henry Sidney; 1641–1704; Earl of Romney	Richard Sackville; 1522–1677; 5th Earl of Dorset, etc.
Duke of Beaufort, 1682	Baron Cranfield, 1674; Earl of Middlesex (2nd creation), 1675
Edward Seymour; 1633–1708; 4th Baronet	William Seymour; 1650–1671; 3rd Duke of Somerset, 2nd Marquess of Hertford, 3rd Earl of Hertford	John Seymour c. 1646–1675; 4th Duke of Somerset, 3rd Marquess of Hertford, 4th Earl of Hertford	Francis Seymour; 1658–1678; 5th Duke of Somerset, 3rd Lord Seymour of Trowbridge	Charles Seymour; 1662–1748; 6th Duke of Somerset	Henry Somerset; 1629–1700; 1st Duke of Beaufort, 3rd Marquess of Worcester, 7th Earl of Worcester, 9th Baron Herbert	Robert Sidney; 1649–1702; 4th Earl of Leicester	Thomas Pelham; 1653–1712	Charles Sackville; 1522–1677; 6th Earl of Dorset, etc., 1st Earl of Middlesex, etc.
Marquessate of Hertford (1st creation) extinct, 1675
Baron Conway of Ragley, 1703; Baron Conway of Killultagh, 1712	Duke of Dorset, 1720
Edward Seymour; 1663–1740; 5th Baronet	Francis Seymour-Conway; 1679–1732; 1st Baron Conway	Edward Coke d. 1707	Algernon Seymour; 1684–1750; 7th Duke of Somerset, Earl of Northumberland	Charles Somerset; 1660–1698 styled Marquess of Worcester	Philip Sidney; 1676–1705; 5th Earl of Leicester	John Sidney; 1680–1737; 6th Earl of Leicester	Jocelyn Sidney; 1682–1743; 7th Earl of Leicester	Elizabeth Pelham; 1681–1711	Lionel Sackville; 1688–1765; 1st Duke of Dorset, 7th Earl of Dorset, etc., 2nd Earl of Middlesex, etc.
Earldom of Leicester (4th creation) extinct, 1743
Baron Lovel, of Minster Lovel, 1728; Earl of Leicester (5th creation) and Viscount Coke, 1744
Edward Seymour; 1695–1757; 8th Duke of Somerset; 6th Baronet	Anne Coke	Thomas Coke; 1697–1759; Earl of Leicester, etc.	Henry Somerset; 1684–1714; 2nd Duke of Beaufort, 4th Marquess of Worcester, 8th Earl of Worcester, 10th Baron Herbert	Charles Townshend; 1700–1764; Viscount Townshend
Earl of Hertford (4th creation) and Viscount Beauchamp (2nd creation), 1850; Marquess of Hertford (2nd creation) and Earl of Yarmouth (3rd creation), 1793	Earldom of Leicester (5th creation) and subsidiary titles extinct, 1759	Viscount Sackville and Baron Bolebrooke, 1782
Edward Seymour; 1717–1792; 9th Duke of Somerset	Webb Seymour; 1718–1793; 10th Duke of Somerset	Francis Seymour; 1726–1799	Francis Seymour-Conway; 1718–1794; 1st Marquess of Hertford, etc., 2nd Baron Conway	Wenman (Roberts) Coke c. 1717–1776	Henry Somerset-Scudamore; 1707–1745; 3rd Duke of Beaufort, 5th Marquess of Worcester, 9th Earl of Worcester, 11th Baron Herbert	Charles Noel Somerset; 1709–1756; 4th Duke of Beaufort, 6th Marquess of Worcester, 10th Earl of Worcester, 12th Baron Herbert	George Townshend; 1724–1807; Marquess Townshend	Charles Sackville; 1711–1769; 2nd Duke of Dorset, 8th Earl of Dorset, etc., 3rd Earl of Middlesex, etc.	John Sackville; 1713–1765	George Germain; 1716–1785; 1st Viscount Sackville, etc.
Earl of Leicester (7th creation) and Viscount Coke (2nd creation), 1837	Baron Botetourt abeyance terminated, 1803	Earl of Leicester (6th creation), 1784
Francis Compton Seymour d. 1822	Francis Ingram-Seymour-Conway; 1743–1822; 2nd Marquess of Hertford, etc., 3rd Baron Conway	Hugh Seymour; 1759–1801	Thomas William Coke; 1754–1842; 1st Earl of Leicester, etc.	Henry Somerset; 1744–1803; 5th Duke of Beaufort, 7th Marquess of Worcester, 11th Earl of Worcester, 13th Baron Herbert, 5th Baron Botetourt	George Townshend; 1753–1811; 2nd Marquess Townshend, 1st Earl of Leicester	John Frederick Sackville; 1745–1799; 3rd Duke of Dorset, 9th Earl of Dorset, etc., 4th Earl of Middlesex, etc.
Baron Raglan, 1852
Edward Adolphus St Maur; 1775–1855; 11th Duke of Somerset	Francis Charles Seymour-Conway; 1777–1842; 3rd Marquess of Hertford, etc., 4th Baron Conway	George Seymour; 1787–1870	Henry Charles Somerset; 1766–1835; 6th Duke of Beaufort, 8th Marquess of Worcester, 12th Earl of Worcester, 14th Baron Herbert, 6th Baron Botetourt	FitzRoy James Henry Somerset; 1788–1855; 1st Baron Raglan	George Townshend; 1778–1855; 3rd Marquess Townshend, 2nd Earl of Leicester	George John Frederick Sackville; 1793–1815; 4th Duke of Dorset, 10th Earl of Dorset, etc., 5th Earl of Middlesex, etc.	John Frederick Sackville; 1767–1843; 5th Duke of Dorset, 11th Earl of Dorset, 6th Earl of Middlesex, etc., 2nd Viscount Sackville, etc.
Earldom of Leicester (6th creation) extinct, 1855	Dukedom of Dorset, Earldoms of Dorset (4th creation) and Middlesex (2nd creation), Viscountcy of Sackville, Baronies of Buckhurst (1st creation), Cranfield, and Bolebrooke extinct, 1843
Francis Edward Seymour; 1788–1866	Richard Seymour-Conway; 1800–1870; 4th Marquess of Hertford, etc., 5th Baron Conway	Francis George Hugh Seymour; 1812–1884; 5th Marquess of Hertford, etc., 6th Baron Conway	Henry Somerset; 1792–1853; 7th Duke of Beaufort, 9th Marquess of Worcester, 13th Earl of Worcester, 15th Baron Herbert, 7th Baron Botetourt
Earl St. Maur, 1863
Edward Adolphus St Maur; 1804–1885; 12th Duke of Somerset	Archibald Henry Algernon St Maur; 1810–1891; 13th Duke of Somerset	Algernon Percy Banks St Maur; 1813–1894; 14th Duke of Somerset	Francis Payne Seymour; 1815–1870	Thomas William Coke; 1822–1909; 2nd Earl of Leicester, etc.	Henry Charles FitzRoy Somerset; 1824–1899; 8th Duke of Beaufort, 10th Marquess of Worcester, 14th Earl of Worcester, 16th Baron Herbert, 8th Baron Botetourt	Richard Henry FitzRoy Somerset; 1817–1884; 2nd Baron Raglan
Earldom St. Maur extinct, 1885
Edward Adolphus Ferdinand St. Maur; 1835–1869	Algernon St Maur; 1846–1923; 15th Duke of Somerset	Edward Hamilton Seymour; 1860–1931; 16th Duke of Somerset	Hugh de Grey Seymour; 1843–1912; 6th Marquess of Hertford, etc., 7th Baron Conway	Thomas William Coke; 1848–1941; 3rd Earl of Leicester, etc.	Henry Adelbert Wellington FitzRoy Somerset; 1847–1924; 9th Duke of Beaufort, 11th Marquess of Worcester, 15th Earl of Worcester, 17th Baron Herbert, 9th Baron Botetourt	Henry Richard Charles Somerset; 1849–1932	George FitzRoy Henry Somerset; 1857–1921; 3rd Baron Raglan
Evelyn Francis Edward Seymour; 1882–1954; 17th Duke of Somerset	George Francis Alexander Seymour; 1871–1940; 7th Marquess of Hertford, etc., 8th Baron Conway	Henry Charles Seymour; 1878–1939	Thomas William Coke; 1880–1949; 4th Earl of Leicester, etc.	Arthur George Coke; 1882–1915	Henry Charles Somers Augustus Somerset; 1874–1945	FitzRoy Richard Somerset; 1885–1964; 4th Baron Raglan
Percy Hamilton Seymour; 1910–1984; 18th Duke of Somerset	Thomas William Edward Coke; 1908–1976; 5th Earl of Leicester, etc.	Anthony Louis Lovel Coke; 1909–1994; 6th Earl of Leicester, etc.	Henry Hugh Arthur FitzRoy Somerset; 1900–1984; 10th Duke of Beaufort, 12th Marquess of Worcester, 16th Earl of Worcester, 18th Baron Herbert, 10th Baron Botetourt	Henry Robert Somers FitzRoy de Vere Somerset; 1898–1965
Barony Botetourt abeyant, 1984
Hugh Edward Conway Seymour; 1930–1997; 8th Marquess of Hertford, etc., 9th Baron Conway	Edward Douglas Coke; 1936–2015; 7th Earl of Leicester, etc.	David Robert Somerset; 1928–2017; 11th Duke of Beaufort, 13th Marquess of Worcester, 17th Earl of Worcester	FitzRoy John Somerset; 1927–2010; 5th Baron Raglan	Geoffrey Somerset; 1932–2025; 6th Baron Raglan
John Michael Edward Seymour b. 1952; 19th Duke of Somerset	Henry (Harry) Jocelyn Seymour b. 1958; 9th Marquess of Hertford, etc., 10th Baron Conway	Thomas Edward Coke b. 1965; 8th Earl of Leicester, etc.	Henry John FitzRoy Somerset b. 1952; 12th Duke of Beaufort, 14th Marquess of Worcester, 18th Earl of Worcester	Arthur Geoffrey Somerset; 1960–2012
Sebastian Edward Seymour b. 1982 styled Lord Seymour	William Francis Seymour b. 1993 styled Earl of Yarmouth	Edward Horatio Coke b. 2003 styled Viscount Coke	Henry Robert FitzRoy Somerset b. 1989 styled Marquess of Worcester	Inigo Arthur Fitzroy Somerset; 7th Baron Raglan b. 2004	Ivo Geoffrey Arthur Tarsus Somerset b. 2007
Heir apparent to the Dukedom of Somerset	Heir apparent to the Marquessate of Hertford	Heir apparent to the Earldom of Leicester	Heir apparent to the Dukedom of Beaufort	Heir presumptive to the Raglan Barony

Honorary titles
Preceded by Humphrey de Bohun	Lord Warden of the Cinque Ports; 1264	Succeeded by Henry de Sandwich
Preceded by The Earl of Leicester	Lord High Steward; 1265–1296	Succeeded by The Earl of Lancaster
Peerage of England
New creation	Earl of Leicester; 1265–1296	Succeeded by Thomas
New creation	Earl of Lancaster; 1267–1296	Succeeded by Thomas
