= Margaret of France, Queen of England =

Queen of England from 1299 to 1307

Margaret of France
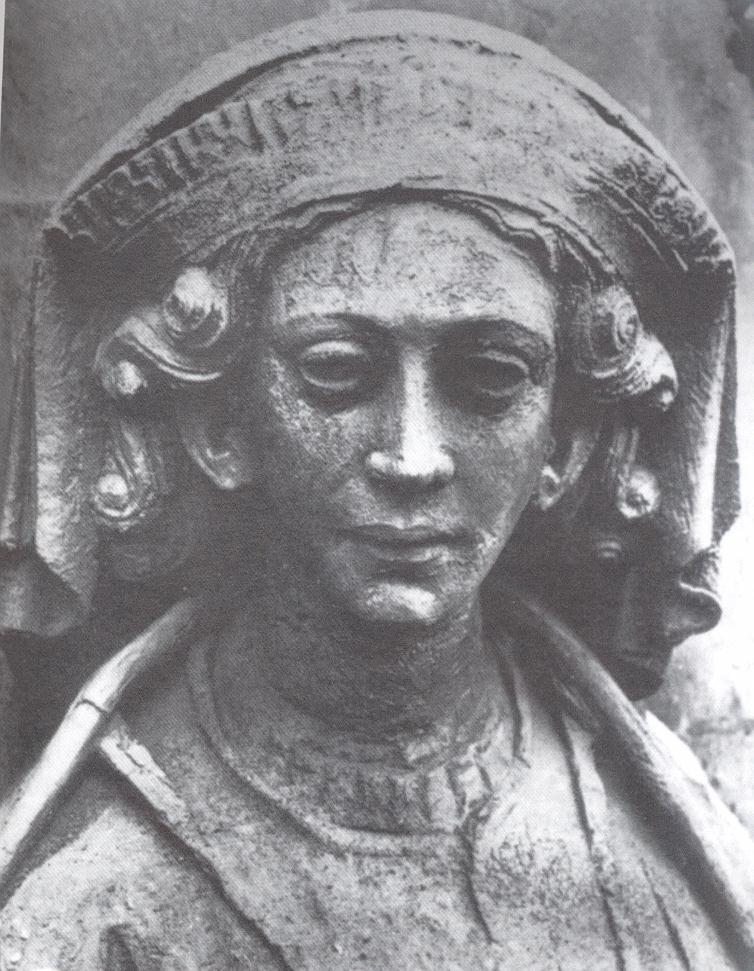
- Statue at Lincoln Cathedral

Queen consort of England
- Tenure: 8 September 1299 – 7 July 1307
- Born: c. 1279; Paris, France
- Died: 14 February 1318; Marlborough Castle, Wiltshire, England
- Burial: Christ Church Greyfriars, Newgate, England
- Spouse: Edward I (m. 1299; died 1307)
- Issue more...: Thomas, Earl of Norfolk; Edmund, Earl of Kent
- House: Capet
- Father: Philip III of France
- Mother: Maria of Brabant

Margaret or Marguerite of France (c. 1279 (Note: Margaret's year of birth is variously given as 1277, 1279, and 1282) – 14 February 1318) was Queen of England as the second wife of King Edward I. She was the daughter of Philip III of France and Maria of Brabant.

== Childhood ==
Margaret was the daughter of King Philip III of France and his second wife, Maria of Brabant. Margaret was only six years old when her father died. She grew up under guidance of her mother, and also of Queen Joan I of Navarre, the wife of her half-brother, King Philip IV.

== Marriage negotiations ==
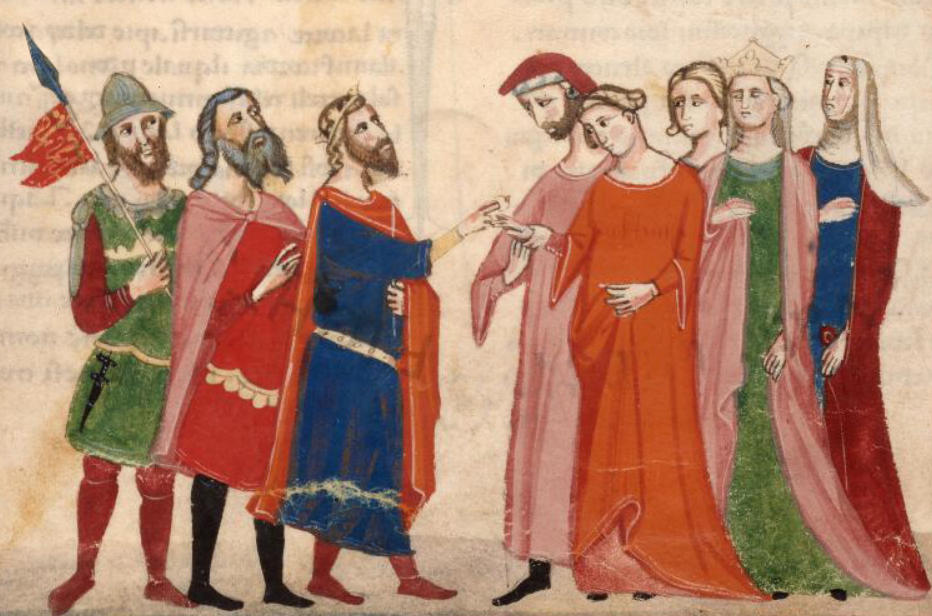
Margaret's marriage to Edward I, depicted in the 14th century Nuova Cronica

The death of his beloved first wife, Eleanor of Castile, in 1290, left King Edward I grief-stricken. He was at the time at war with France and Scotland. He and Eleanor had only one surviving son, Edward, and so the king was anxious to remarry to have more sons. In summer of 1291, Edward betrothed his son to Blanche, half-sister to Margaret and Philip IV, in order to achieve peace with France. However, having been told of Blanche's renowned beauty, Edward decided to have his son's bride for his own and sent emissaries to France. Philip IV agreed to have Blanche marry Edward on the conditions that a truce would be concluded between the two countries, and that Edward would give up the province of Gascony.

Edward agreed, and sent his brother Edmund Crouchback, Earl of Lancaster, to fetch the new bride. Edward had been deceived, for Blanche was to be married to Rudolph, the eldest son of King Albert I of Germany. Instead, Philip IV offered her younger sister Margaret to marry Edward (then 55). Upon hearing this, Edward declared war on France, refusing to marry Margaret. After five years, a truce was agreed upon under the influence of Pope Boniface VIII. A series of treaties in the first half of 1299 provided terms for a double marriage: Edward I would marry Margaret and his son would marry Isabella, Philip IV's only surviving daughter and Margaret's niece. Additionally, the English monarchy would regain the key territory of Guyenne and receive £15,000 owed to Margaret as well as the return of Eleanor of Castile's lands in Ponthieu and Montreuil as a dower first for Margaret and then Isabella.

== Queenship ==
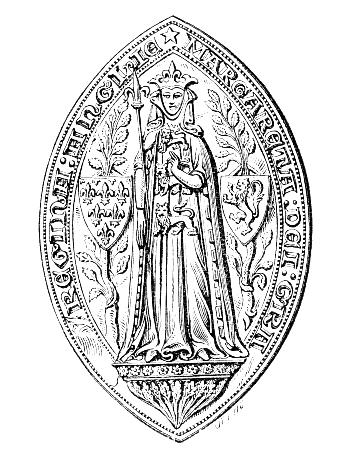
Margaret's seal as queen

Edward was then 60 years old, at least 40 years older than his bride. The wedding took place at Canterbury on 10 September 1299. Margaret was never crowned due to financial constraints, being the first uncrowned queen since the Conquest. This in no way lessened her dignity as the king's wife, however, for she used the royal title in her letters and documents, and appeared publicly wearing a crown even though she had not received one during a formal rite of investiture.

Edward soon returned to the Scottish border to continue his campaigns and left Margaret in London, but she had become pregnant quickly after the wedding. After several months, bored and lonely, the young queen decided to join her husband. Nothing could have pleased the king more, for Margaret's actions reminded him of his first wife Eleanor, who had had two of her sixteen children abroad. In less than a year Margaret gave birth to a son, Thomas, who was named after Thomas Becket, since she had prayed to him during her pregnancy. The next year she gave birth to another son, Edmund.

Many who fell under the king's wrath were saved from too stern a punishment by the queen's influence over her husband, and the statement, Pardoned solely on the intercession of our dearest consort, queen Margaret of England, appears. In 1305, the young queen acted as a mediator between her step-son and husband, reconciling the heir apparent to his aging father, and calming her husband's wrath. She and her stepson, who was only five years younger than she, also became fond of each other: he once made her a gift of an expensive ruby and gold ring, and she on one occasion rescued many of the prince's friends from the wrath of the king.

Margaret favoured the Franciscan order and was a benefactress of a new foundation at Newgate. She employed the minstrel Guy de Psaltery and both she and her husband liked to play chess. The mismatched couple were blissfully happy. When her sister Blanche died in 1305, Edward ordered full court mourning to please his wife. He had realised the wife he had gained was "a pearl of great price" as Margaret was respected for her beauty, virtue, and piety. The same year Margaret gave birth to a girl, Eleanor, named in honour of Edward's first wife, a choice which surprised many, and showed Margaret's unjealous nature.

In 1307, when Edward went on summer campaign to Scotland, Margaret accompanied him. Edward died in Burgh by Sands.

== Widowhood ==
Arms of Margaret of France as Queen of England.

Margaret never remarried after Edward's death in 1307, despite being only 28 when widowed. She was alleged to have stated that, "when Edward died, all men died for me".

Margaret was not pleased when Edward II elevated Piers Gaveston to become Earl of Cornwall upon his father's death, since the title had been meant for one of her own sons. She attended the new king's wedding to her niece Isabella, and a silver casket was made with both their arms. After Isabella's coronation, Margaret retired to Marlborough Castle (which was by this time a dower house), but she stayed in touch with the new queen and with her half-brother Philip IV by letter during the confusing times leading up to Gaveston's death in 1312. Margaret, too, was a victim of Gaveston's influence over her stepson. Edward II gave several of her dower lands to the favourite, including Berkhamsted Castle. In May 1308, an anonymous informer reported that Margaret had provided £40,000 along with Philip IV to support the English barons against Gaveston. Due to this action, Gaveston was briefly exiled and Margaret remained fairly unmolested by the upstart until his death in June 1312.

She was present at the birth of Edward III in November 1312.

On 14 February 1318 she died in her castle at Marlborough. Dressed in a Franciscan habit, she was buried at Christ Church Greyfriars in London, a church she had generously endowed. Her tomb was destroyed during the Reformation.

== Issue ==
In all, Margaret gave birth to three children:

- Thomas of Brotherton, 1st Earl of Norfolk (1 June 1300 – 4 August 1338)
- Edmund of Woodstock, 1st Earl of Kent (5 August 1301 – 19 March 1330)
- Eleanor (4 May 1306 – 1311) Died at Amesbury Abbey, buried at Beaulieu Abbey.

== Genealogical table ==
Margaret's relationship to the royal families of France and England

Marie of Brabant	Philip III of France	Isabella of Aragon
Eleanor of Castile	Edward I of England	Margaret of France	Blanche of France	Rudolph III of Austria	Philip IV of France	Joan I of Navarre
Edward II of England	Isabella of France
Edward III of England

== Sources ==
- Boutell, Charles (1863), A Manual of Heraldry, Historical and Popular, Winsor & Newton
- Bradbury, Jim (2007). The Capetians, Kings of France 987–1328. Hambledon Continuum.
- Crawford, Anne (2003). "Margaret of France (c.1277–1318)". In Hartley, Cathy (ed.). A Historical Dictionary of British Women. Europa Publications.
- Dodd, Gwilym; Musson, Anthony, eds. (2006). The Reign of Edward II: New Perspectives. York Medieval Press.
- Parsons, John Carmi (2004). "Margaret (1279?–1318)". Oxford Dictionary of National Biography (Online ed.). Oxford, UK: Oxford University Press. doi:10.1093/ref:odnb/18046.
- Prestwich, Michael (1997). Edward I. New Haven: Yale University Press. ISBN 978-0-300-14665-3. OCLC 890476967.
- Prestwich, Michael (2015). "Margaret of France (c.1282-1318)". In Cannon, John; Crowcroft, Robert (eds.). The Oxford Companion to British History. Oxford University Press. ISBN 9780191044816.
- Stanton, Anne Rudloff (2001). The Queen Mary Psalter: A Study of Affect and Audience. Vol. 91 Part 6. American Philosophical Society.
- Warner, Kathryn (2016). Isabella of France: The Rebel Queen. Amberley Publishing.
- Williamson, David (1986). Kings and Queens of Britain. Topsfield, MA: Salem House Publ. ISBN 0-88162-213-3.

Margaret of France, Queen of England House of Capet Born: 1279 Died: 14 February 1318
English royalty
Vacant Title last held by Eleanor of Castile	Queen consort of England; 8 September 1299 – 7 July 1307	Vacant Title next held by Isabella of France
