= Robert of France (died 1308) =

French prince (1296/1297–1308)

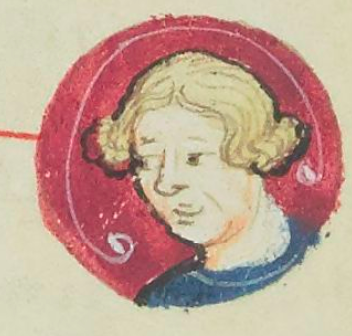
- Born: 1296/1297; Paris, France
- Died: 1308; Saint-Germain-en-Laye, France
- House: Capet
- Father: Philip IV of France
- Mother: Joan I of Navarre

Robert of France (c. 1296/1297 – 1308), was the youngest child of King Philip IV of France and Joan I of Navarre. He died young, but was briefly betrothed to Constance of Sicily.

== Life ==
Born in Paris, Robert was born either in 1296 or 1297. He was the youngest child of Philip IV of France and his wife Joan, the reigning Queen of Navarre. In 1306, at the age of ten, he was betrothed to Constance of Sicily, daughter of Frederick II of Sicily and Eleanor of Anjou. However, Robert died in 1308, and the marriage alliance was abandoned. Constance would later go on to become Queen of Cyprus as the wife of Henry II of Cyprus.

== Ancestry ==
Ancestors of Robert of France (died 1308)

8. Louis IX of France
4. Philip III of France
9. Margaret of Provence
2. Philip IV of France
10. James I of Aragon
5. Isabella of Aragon
11. Violant of Hungary
1. Robert of France
12. Theobald I of Navarre
6. Henry I of Navarre
13. Margaret of Bourbon
3. Joan I of Navarre
14. Robert I of Artois
7. Blanche of Artois
15. Matilda of Brabant
