= Treaty of Orléans =

1275 treaty between Navarre and France

Arms of France and Navarre

The Treaty of Orléans was a marriage treaty signed in 1275, that led to a short-lived personal union between the kingdoms of Navarre and France. It was signed by Philip III of France and his cousin Blanche of Artois, mother and regent to the two-year-old Joan I of Navarre. The original intent of the treaty was to not create a personal union, however, but to enable Philip to administer Navarre in Joan's name. Joan was also to marry either Philip's firstborn and heir apparent, Louis, or his second son, Philip. Pope Gregory X explicitly stated that he preferred a match with the younger son, as he probably wished to avoid merging Navarre with France. Louis died in 1276, however, leaving Philip as the only choice per the terms of the treaty.

Notably, the treaty bound both Philip and Blanche to convince their children to accept the marriage once they reach the age of consent, "unless serious illness, deformity, or other reasonable impediment appears in either of them before their marriage". The treaty also stipulated that if Joan's husband was not to succeed to the French throne, she would be assigned an additional annual revenue of 4,000 livres as compensation for her dower. If Joan's husband did succeed Philip, Philip promised that she would receive an even larger dower. The treaty was to have no effect on Blanche's guardianship over Joan or Blanche's own dower. The first French-appointed governor of Navarre, per the terms of the treaty, was the seneschal of Toulouse Eustache de Beaumarché.

The treaty effectively gave France a strategic stronghold in Iberia, but it also ensured that Joan would not lose her kingdom to the neighbouring Castile and Aragon. More importantly, however, it brought Joan's County of Champagne into the French royal domain. The personal union created by the treaty ended in 1328, when Philip and Joan's granddaughter Joan II of Navarre failed to inherit the French crown. Champagne, however, remained in French hands.
