= Navarrese Civil War =

Navarrese Civil War may refer to:

- The War of the Navarrese Succession, or Navarrese revolt (1276–1277); see Philip III of France § Treaty with Navarre
- Navarrese Civil War (1451–1455)
