= Marie of Brabant, Queen of France =

Queen of France from 1274 to 1285

Marie of Brabant
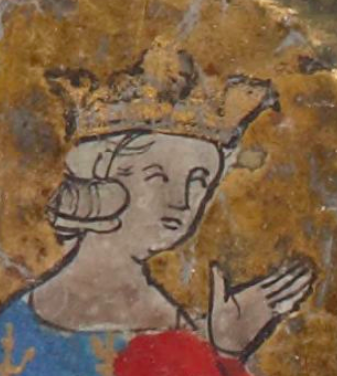
- Detail of Marie in the Meliacin ou le Cheval de fust, c. 1285

Queen consort of France
- Tenure: 21 August 1274 – 5 October 1285
- Coronation: 24 June 1275
- Born: 13 May 1254; Leuven, Brabant, Holy Roman Empire
- Died: 12 January 1322 (aged 67); Les Mureaux, France
- Burial: Cordeliers Convent, Paris
- Spouse: Philip III of France (m. 1274; died 1285)
- Issue: Louis, Count of Évreux; Blanche, Duchess of Austria; Margaret, Queen of England
- House: House of Reginar
- Father: Henry III, Duke of Brabant
- Mother: Adelaide of Burgundy

Marie of Brabant (13 May 1254 – 12 January 1322) was Queen of France from 1274 until 1285 as the second wife of King Philip III. Born in Leuven, Brabant, she was the daughter of Henry III, Duke of Brabant, and Adelaide of Burgundy.

== Queen ==
Arms of Marie as queen consort of France

Marie married the widowed Philip III of France on 21 August 1274. His first wife, Isabella of Aragon, had already given birth to three surviving sons: Louis, Philip and Charles.

Philip was under the strong influence of his mother, Margaret of Provence, and his minion, surgeon and chamberlain (Chambellan) Pierre de la Broce. Not being French, Marie stood out at the French court. In 1276, Marie's stepson Louis died under suspicious circumstances. Marie was suspected of ordering him to be poisoned. La Broce, who was also suspected, was imprisoned and later executed for the murder.

== Queen dowager ==
After the death of Philip III in 1285, Marie lost some of her political influence, and dedicated her life to their three children: Louis (May 1276 – 19 May 1319), Blanche (1278 – 19 March 1305) and Margaret (died in 1318). Her stepson Philip IV was crowned king of France on 6 January 1286 in Reims.

Together with Joan I of Navarre and Blanche of Artois, she negotiated peace in 1294 between England and France with Edmund Crouchback, the younger brother of Edward I of England, although the peace was not honoured and broken by Philip IV.

Marie lived through Philip IV's reign and she outlived her children. She died in 1322, aged 67, in the monastery at Les Mureaux, near Meulan, where she had withdrawn to in 1316. Marie was not buried in the royal necropolis of Basilica of Saint-Denis, but in the Cordeliers Convent, in Paris. Destroyed in a fire in 1580, the church was rebuilt in the following years.

== See also ==
- Marie of Brabant (disambiguation)

== Sources ==
- Bradbury, Jim (2007). The Capetians, Kings of France 987–1328. Hambledon Continuum.
- Dunbabin, Jean (2011). The French in the Kingdom of Sicily, 1266–1305. Cambridge University Press.
- Gaude-Ferragu, Murielle (2016). Queenship in Medieval France, 1300–1500. Palgrave Macmillan.
- Jordan, William Chester (2009). A Tale of Two Monasteries: Westminster and Saint-Denis in the Thirteenth Century. Princeton University Press.
- Morris, Marc (2008). Edward I and the Forging of Britain. Windmill Books.
- Stanton, Anne Rudloff (2001). The Queen Mary Psalter: A Study of Affect and Audience. Vol. 91 Part 6. American Philosophical Society.
- Viard, Jules Marie Édouard (1930). Grandes Chroniques de France. Librairie Ancienne Honoré Champion.

French royalty
Vacant Title last held by Isabella of Aragon	Queen consort of France; 1274–1285	Succeeded by Joan I of Navarre
