= Jeanne I =

Jeanne I may refer to:

- Jeanne I, Countess of Burgundy (1191–1205)
- Jeanne I of Navarre (1273–1305)
- Jeanne I of Auvergne (1326–1360)
