= Pierre de la Broce =

French monarchy councillor (??–1278)

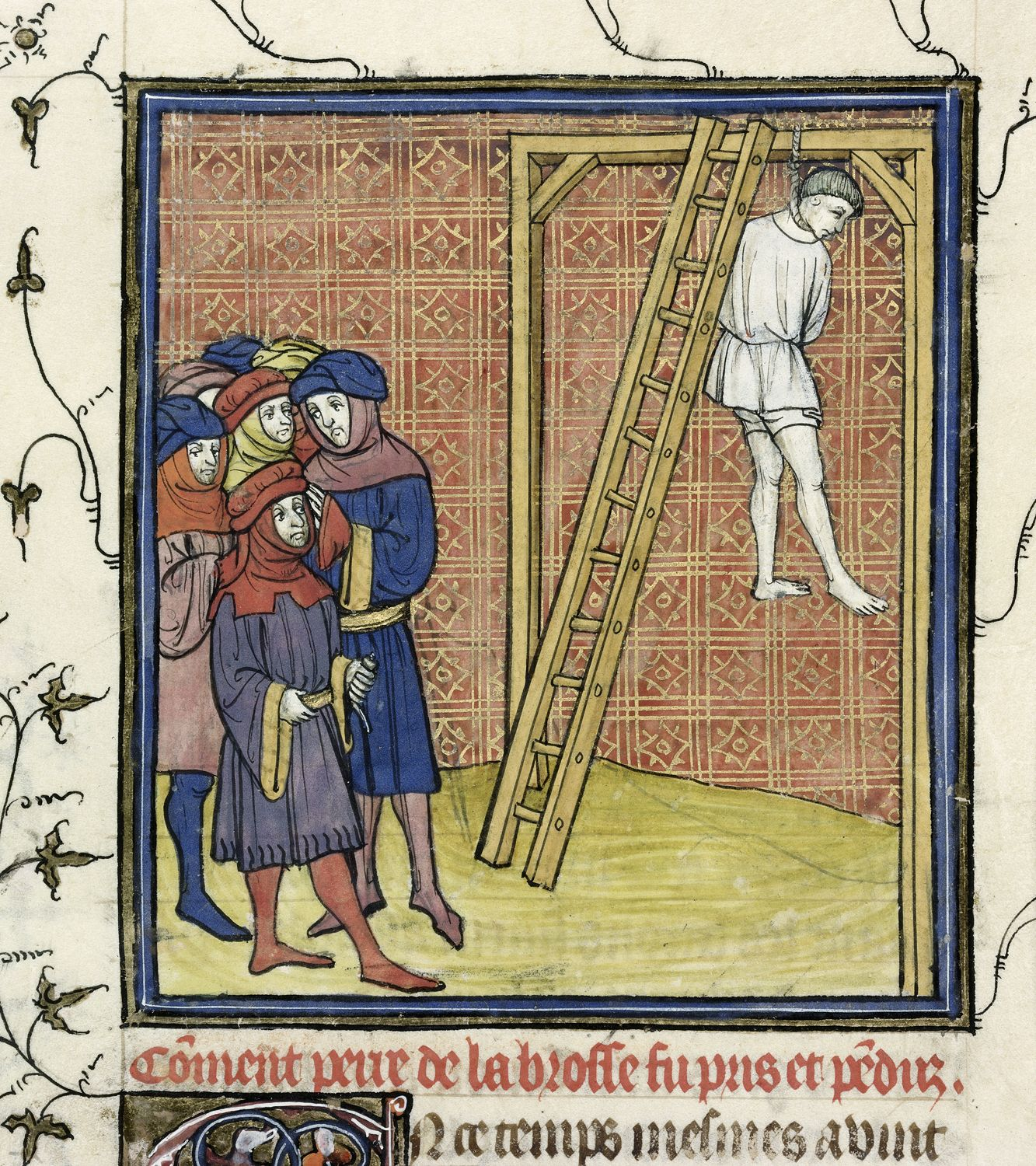
Pierre de La Brosse hanged, from Chroniques de France, (British Library Royal 20 C VII f. 15

Pierre de la Broce or de la Brosse (died 30 June 1278) was a royal favorite and councilor during the early reign of Philip III of France.

De la Broce was from a family of petty nobility in Touraine, and was the royal physician (by 1255) and chamberlain (by 1266) for Louis IX. After Louis' death in 1270, de la Broce quickly became a favorite of the new king. He accumulated a substantial fortune, built from Philip's largess and from gifts from those hoping to cultivate his influence with the king.

This influence was greatly resented by many of the nobility and by associates of the Queen. In 1276 he was accused of having poisoned the king's eldest son and his wife, Isabelle d'Aragon. In 1277 letters allegedly written by de la Broce were presented to Philip, which caused the king to have de la Broce arrested. He was finally hanged six months later. No trial was held, and the evidence was apparently suppressed, so the contents of the letters are unknown. Evidence has been put forward that de la Broce was framed.

== Divine Comedy ==
De la Broce appears in Dante's Purgatory, in Canto VI, with the other spirits of those who, though redeemed, were prevented from making a final confession and reconciliation due to having died by violence:

I saw the soul
cleft from its body out of spite and envy—
not, so it said, because it had been guilty—
I mean Pier de la Brosse,
and may the Lady of Brabant [the Queen of France]
while she's still in this world, watch
her ways—or end among a sadder flock

from Allen Mandelbaum's translation
