= Louis of France (1244–1260) =

French prince

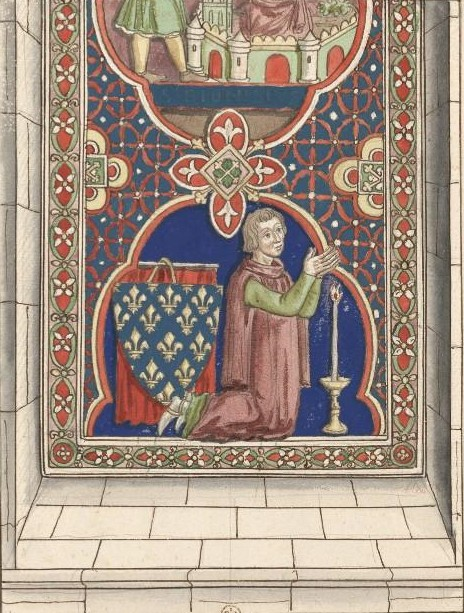
- Prince Louis in prayer; drawing of 13th-century stained glass window in Chartres Cathedral

Regent of France
- Regency: 1252–1254
- Born: 21 or 24 February 1244
- Died: 11 January 1260 (aged 15); Paris
- Burial: Royaumont Abbey
- House: Capet
- Father: Louis IX of France
- Mother: Margaret of Provence

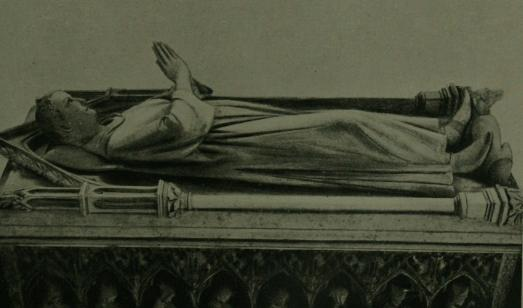
The tomb of Louis of France.

Louis of France (21 or 24 February 1244 – 11 January 1260) was the eldest son of King Louis IX of France and his wife Margaret of Provence. As heir apparent to the throne, he served as regent for a brief period.

== Regency ==
In 1248, King Louis and Queen Margaret traveled to Egypt to participate in the Seventh Crusade. During their absence, his grandmother, Blanche of Castile, acted as regent. However, when she died in 1252, his parents were still crusading and the eight-year-old Louis was appointed regent. He did not actually rule the country; real power was in the hands of a royal council, led by his uncles Alphonse and Charles. Nevertheless, royal deeds were sealed in his name, and correspondence to the government was addressed to him personally. The basis of the arrangement was the unwritten (at the time) principle of primogeniture in French law: in the absence of written instructions to the contrary, the king's eldest son automatically became regent during the king's absence. This regency ended when Louis IX returned to Paris in 1254.

== Education and engagement ==
In subsequent years, Louis was educated for his future role as king. The legal scholar Pierre de Fontaines dedicated his textbook Conseil à un ami to Prince Louis. On 20 August 1255, he was betrothed to Alfonso X of Castile's daughter Berengaria. At the time, she was heir presumptive of Castile. However, shortly after the betrothal, Ferdinand de la Cerda was born, displacing his sister.

Louis and his younger brother Philip witnessed the sealing and oaths confirming the 1259 Treaty of Paris, which was intended to end the territorial conflict between England and France that had been raging since 1180. This treaty required that King Henry III of England pay homage to King Louis IX of France, which he did the following year.

== Death and aftermath ==
Louis fell ill after Christmas 1259 and died shortly after New Year, at age 15 years, 10 months. The theologian Vincent of Beauvais wrote a consolatio for Louis IX, which is considered the traditional Christian consolation and a masterpiece in its genre. Louis' younger brother succeeded their father in 1270 as Philip III.

Louis was buried in Royaumont Abbey. He was not buried in the royal crypt in Saint-Denis, because a decree of Louis IX reserves this crypt for crowned heads. Nevertheless, Louis' body was transferred there in 1817.

== Sources ==
- Denton, Jeffrey (1992). "From the Foundation of Vale Royal Abbey to the Statute of Carlisle: Edward I and Ecclesiastical Patronage". In Coss, Peter R.; Lloyd, Simon D. (eds.). Thirteenth Century England. Vol. IV: Proceedings of the Newcastle Upon Tyne. The Boydell Press. pp. 123–138.
- Jordan, William C. (2017). "A Border Policy? Louis IX and the Spanish Connection". In Liang, Yuen-Gen; Rodriguez, Jarbel (eds.). Authority and Spectacle in Medieval and Early Modern Europe: Essays in Honor of Teofilo F. Ruiz. Routledge.
