= Louis of France (1264–1276) =

Heir apparent to the French throne

Louis
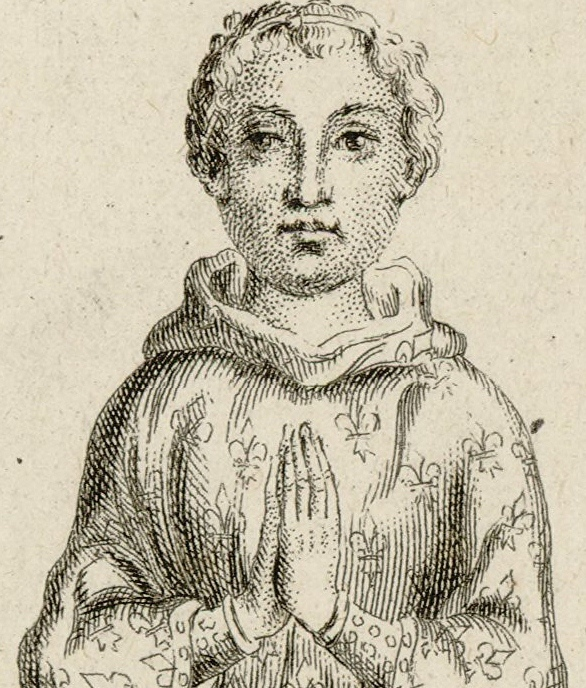
- Born: c.1264 France
- Died: c.1276 (age around 12); Château de Vincennes
- House: Capet
- Father: Philip III of France
- Mother: Isabella of Aragon

Louis of France (c. 1264 – Château de Vincennes, before May 1276), was heir apparent to the French throne. He was the eldest son of King Philip III of France and his first wife, Isabella of Aragon.

== Life ==
Louis had three younger brothers: Philip IV the Fair, Robert and Charles. His mother died in Calabria following a riding accident during her pregnancy with her fifth child, in 1270. At his death at the age of 12, his younger brother Philip, succeeded him as heir apparent.

== Circumstances of his death ==
Following his death, Pierre de la Broce, Philip's chamberlain, accused Mary of Brabant, Philip's second wife, of poisoning Louis. By 1277, suspicion had fallen on Pierre de la Broce, who was then tried for treachery, and hanged at Montfaucon.

== Sources ==
- Bradbury, Jim (2007). The Capetians: Kings of France 987–1328. Hambledon Continuum.
- Caciola, Nancy (2003). Discerning Spirits: Divine and Demonic Possession in the Middle Ages. Cornell University Press.
- Field, Sean L. (2019). Courting Sanctity: Holy Women and the Capetians. Cornell University Press.
- Warner, Kathryn (2017). Isabella of France: The Rebel Queen. Amberley Publishing.
- Woodacre, Elena (2013). The Queens Regnant of Navarre. Palgrave Macmillan.
