= Isabella of Aragon, Queen of France =

Queen of France from 1270 to 1271

Isabella of Aragon
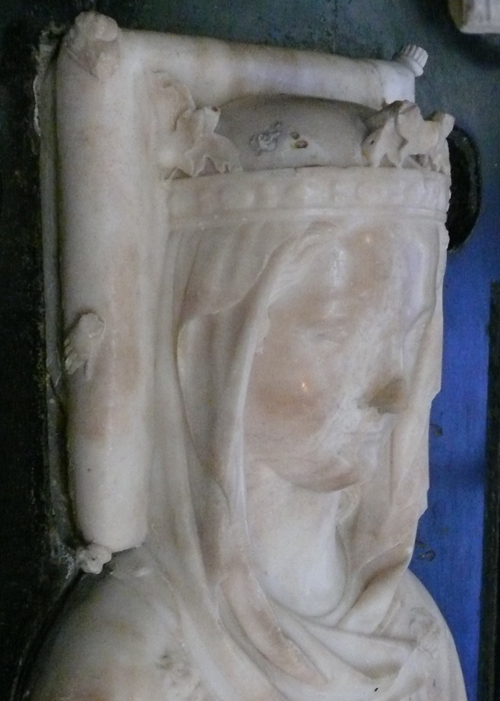

Queen consort of France
- Tenure: 25 August 1270 – 28 January 1271
- Born: 1248
- Died: 28 January 1271 (aged 22–23); Cosenza, Kingdom of Sicily
- Burial: Basilica of St Denis
- Spouse: Philip III of France (m. 1262)
- Issue: Louis; Philip IV of France; Robert; Charles, Count of Valois
- House: Barcelona
- Father: James I of Aragon
- Mother: Violant of Hungary

Isabella of Aragon (c. 1247 – 28 January 1271), was Queen of France from 1270 to 1271 by marriage to Philip III of France.

== Life ==
Isabella was the eighth child and youngest daughter of King James I of Aragon and his second wife, Violant of Hungary. Her exact date of birth was not recorded, but she certainly was born in late 1247 or early 1248 since her father, who financially supported the Monastery of Santa María de Sigena, stipulated in his will in January 1248 that if he had another son, he should become a knight Templar and if the child was a daughter, she should enter Santa María de Sigena as a nun. The will was certainly abandoned before Isabella's birth because she was married.

On 11 May 1258, the Treaty of Corbeil was concluded between Isabella's father and King Louis IX of France. As part of the agreement a betrothal was arranged between Louis's second son, Philip, and Isabella, the youngest daughter of James I. The formal wedding took place on 28 May 1262 at the city of Clairmont (currently Clermont-Ferrand); by that time, Philip was already the heir apparent to the French throne due to the death of his older brother, Louis, in 1260.

Having accompanied her husband and father-in-law on the Eighth Crusade against Tunis in July 1270, Isabella became queen of France the following month on the death of King Louis IX. On their way home, while crossing the Savuto river near Martirano in Calabria, on 11 January 1271 she suffered a fall from her horse: six months pregnant with her fifth child, she gave birth prematurely to a son, who died soon after. First transported to Martirano Castle and then to Cosenza, exhausted and feverish, Isabella died there on 28 January 1271 aged 24. Her death was a devastating emotional blow to her husband, especially since she had been pregnant.

Because she died far from her homeland, the funeral technique of Mos Teutonicus was practiced upon Isabella. Firstly, she was buried at Cosenza Cathedral alongside her newborn son, and then in the royal necropolis in the Basilica of St Denis. Isabella's tomb, like many others, was desecrated during the French Revolution in August 1793.

The tragic end of Isabella is recalled in the Laudi of the poet Gabriele D'Annunzio.

== Issue ==
1. Louis (1264 –1276), heir apparent to the French throne from 1270 until his death
2. Philip IV (1268 –1314), King of France
3. Robert (1269 –1271).
4. Charles, Count of Valois (1270 –1325).
5. Stillborn son (January 1271).

== Sources ==
- Rodrigo Estevan, María Luz (2009). "Los testamentos de Jaime I: Repartos territoriales y turbulencias políticas". Cuadernos, Centro de Estudios de Monzón y Cinca Media (in Spanish) (35): 61–90. ISSN 1133-3790.
- Sivéry, Gérard (2003). Philippe III le Hardi (in French). Fayard.
- Zurita, Jerónimo (1977). López, Angel Canellas (ed.). Anales de Aragón (PDF) (in Spanish). Exma. Diputación de Zaragoza, «Institución Fernando el Católico».

Isabella of Aragon, Queen of France House of Barcelona Cadet branch of the Bellonids Born: 1248 Died: 28 January 1271
French royalty
| Preceded by Margaret of Provence | Queen consort of France; 25 August 1270 – 28 January 1271 | Vacant Title next held by Marie of Brabant |
