= Joan I of Navarre =

Queen of Navarre from 1274 to 1305

Joan I
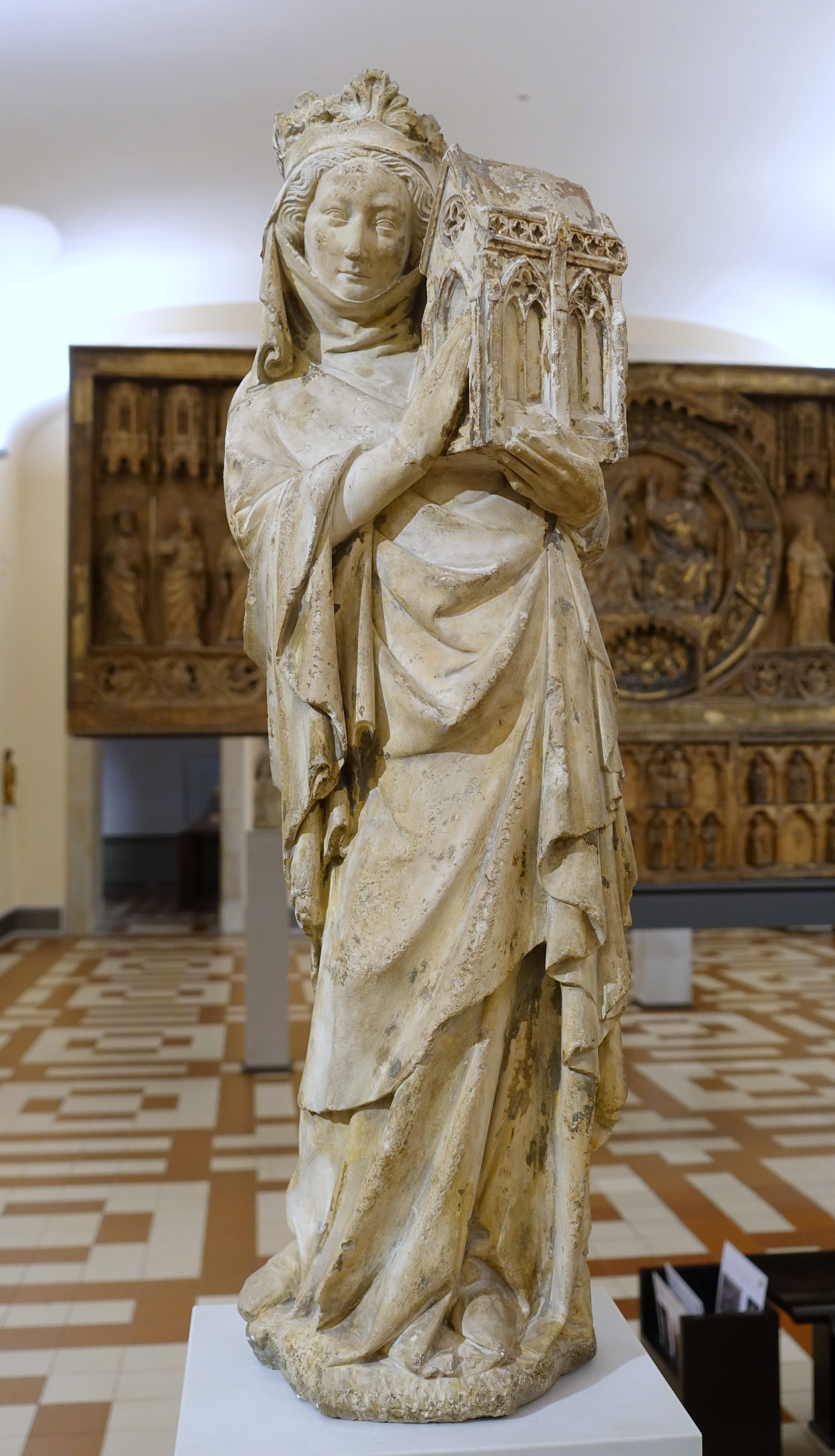
- Queen Joan as Benefactress, c. 1305, limestone

Queen of Navarre; Countess of Champagne
- Reign: 22 July 1274 – 2 April 1305
- Predecessor: Henry I
- Successor: Louis I
- Co-ruler: Philip I (1284–1305)

Queen consort of France
- Tenure: 5 October 1285 – 2 April 1305
- Coronation: 5 January 1286
- Born: 14 January 1273; Bar-sur-Seine, Kingdom of France
- Died: 2 April 1305 (aged 32); Château de Vincennes, Kingdom of France
- Burial: Cordeliers Convent, Paris, France
- Spouse: Philip IV of France (m. 1284)
- Issue more…: Louis X, King of France; Philip V, King of France; Charles IV, King of France; Isabella, Queen of England; Robert
- House: House of Blois; House of Blois-Champagne; House of Blois-Navarre
- Father: Henry I of Navarre
- Mother: Blanche of Artois

Joan I (14 January 1273 – 31 March/2 April 1305) (Basque: Joana, Spanish: Juana) was ruling Queen of Navarre and Countess of Champagne from 1274 until 1305. She was also Queen of France by marriage to King Philip IV. She founded the College of Navarre in Paris in 1305.

Joan never ruled Navarre in person; it was overseen by French governors. Having direct control over the County of Champagne, she raised an army to face the invasion of the county by Henry III, Count of Bar, even capturing and imprisoning the count. She died in 1305, most likely from childbirth complications.

== Life ==
Joan was born in Bar-sur-Seine, Champagne on 14 January 1273 the daughter of King Henry I of Navarre and Blanche of Artois. The following year, upon the death of her father, she became Countess of Champagne and Queen of Navarre. Due to her age, her mother, Blanche, was her guardian and regent in Navarre.

Various powers, both foreign and Navarrese, sought to take advantage of the minority of the heiress and the "weakness" of the female regent, which caused Joan and her mother to seek protection at the court of Philip III of France. Her mother arrived in France in 1274, and by the Treaty of Orléans in 1275, Joan was betrothed to one of Philip's sons (Louis or Philip). Blanche therefore placed her daughter and the government of Navarre under the protection of the King of France. After this, Joan was brought up with Philip. It is, in fact, uncertain whether she ever resided in Navarre during her childhood.

=== Queen of France ===
At the age of 11, Joan married the future Philip IV of France on 16 August 1284, becoming queen consort of France a year later. Their three surviving sons would all rule as kings of France, in turn, and their only surviving daughter, Isabella, became queen consort of England.

Joan was described as a success in her role as Queen of France: she secured the succession, she was an efficient mistress of the royal court, a dignified first lady and had a very good relationship with the King. Having grown up together, the couple evidently had a close relationship and Philip is reported to have loved and respected her deeply. His emotional dependence on her is suggested as a reason why she never visited Navarre. In 1294, Philip appointed her regent of France should his son succeed him being still a minor. However, he is not believed to have entrusted her with influence over the affairs of France unless they involved her own domains Navarre and Champagne. She founded the College of Navarre in Paris in 1305.

=== Reign in Navarre and Champagne ===
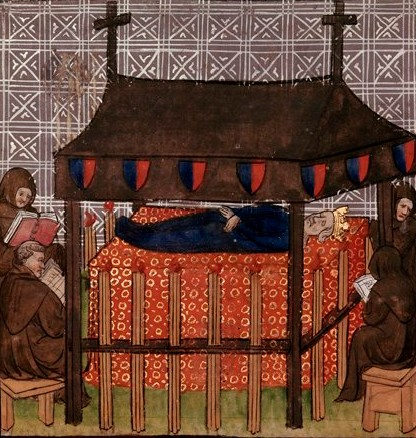
Funeral of Queen Joan I

Joan was declared to be of legal majority upon her marriage in 1284, and did homage for Champagne and Brie to her father-in-law in Paris.

Joan never visited the Kingdom of Navarre, which was ruled in her name by French governors appointed first by her father-in-law and then by her spouse in her name. The French governors were extremely unpopular in Navarre and her absence from the country was resented. It was the French who were blamed for her absence rather than herself, and the loyalty to her was not questioned; rather, it was emphasized in Navarre that it was in fact she rather than the French who was their sovereign. From afar, edicts were issued in her name, coins struck in her image, and she gave her protection to chapels and convents. She never came closer to Navarre than to Carcassonne in 1300, and her spouse was somewhat blamed for this.

Joan was much more directly active as countess of Champagne. While being a county rather than a kingdom, Champagne was much richer and more strategically important. Philip IV appointed her administrators, however, Joan visited Champagne regularly and is recorded to have participated in all duties of a ruling vassal and is not regarded to have been passive but an active independent ruler in this domain. In 1297, she raised and led an army against Count Henry III of Bar when he invaded Champagne. Philip took no part, and Joan brought the count to prison before joining her husband. She also acted in her process against Bishop Guichard of Troyes, whom she accused of having stolen funds from Champagne and her mother by fraud.

== Death ==
Joan died in 1305, allegedly in childbirth, but the bishop of Troyes, Guichard, was arrested in 1308 and accused of killing her with witchcraft. He was released in 1313. Joan was buried at the Cordeliers Convent in Paris.

== Children ==
With Philip IV of France:

1. Margaret (1288 – c. 1294)
2. Louis X of France, King Louis I of Navarre from 1305, France from 1314 (October 1289 – 5 June 1316)
3. Blanche (1290 – c. 1294)
4. Philip V of France and Navarre (as Philip II) (c. 1293 – 3 January 1322)
5. Charles IV of France and Navarre (as Charles I) (c. 1294 – 1 February 1328)
6. Isabella (c. 1295 – 23 August 1358), married Edward II of England
7. Robert (1297 – July 1308)

== Sources ==
- Donzelot, Pierre (1954). French Universities and Their Pursuit of Freedom. Ministère de l'éducation nationale and Columbia University.
- Echols, Anne; Williams, Marty, eds. (1992). An annotated index of medieval women. Markus Wiener Publishers. ISBN 9780910129275.
- Gaude-Ferragu, Murielle (2016). Queenship in Medieval France, 1300-1500. Palgrave Macmillan.
- George, Hereford Brooke (1875). Genealogical table illustrative of Modern History. Oxford at the Clarendon Press.
- Menache, Sophia (1998). Clement V. Cambridge, England: Cambridge University Press. p. 85. ISBN 0521592194.
- Sohn, Andreas (2020). "Colleges and the University of Paris, Professors and Students, Religion and Politics: Some Remarks on the History of Europe in the Late Middle Ages (Thirteenth to Fifteenth Centuries)". In Goeing, Anja-Silvia; Parry, Glyn; Feingold, Mordechai (eds.). Early Modern Universities: Networks of Higher Learning. Brill.
- Warner, Kathryn (2016). Isabella of France, The Rebel Queen. Amberley.
- Woodacre, Elena (2013). The Queens Regnant of Navarre: Succession, Politics, and Partnership, 1274-1512. Palgrave Macmillan.

Regnal titles
Preceded by Henry III	Queen of Navarre; Countess of Champagne; 1274–1305; With: Philip I	Succeeded by Louis I
French royalty
Preceded by Marie of Brabant	Queen consort of France; 1285–1305	Vacant Title next held by Margaret of Burgundy
