= Philip III of France =

King of France from 1270 to 1285

Philip III
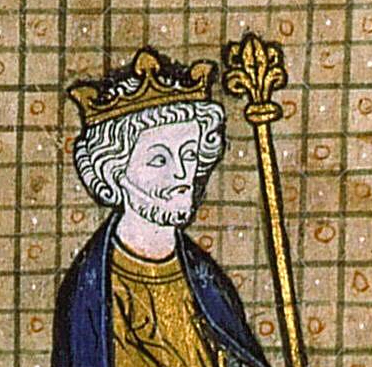
- Philip III, c. 1274 copy of the Grandes Chroniques de France by Primat of Saint Denis (Paris, Bibliothèque Sainte-Geneviève, Ms. 782)

King of France
- Reign: 25 August 1270 – 5 October 1285
- Coronation: 15 August 1271
- Predecessor: Louis IX
- Successor: Philip IV
- Born: 1 May 1245; Poissy
- Died: 5 October 1285 (aged 40); Perpignan
- Burial: initially Narbonne, later Saint Denis Basilica
- Spouses: Isabella of Aragon (m. 1262; died 1271) Maria of Brabant (m. 1274)
- Issue more..: Louis of France; Philip IV, King of France; Charles, Count of Valois; Louis, Count of Évreux; Blanche, Duchess of Austria; Margaret, Queen of England
- House: Capet
- Father: Louis IX of France
- Mother: Margaret of Provence

Philip III (1 May 1245 – 5 October 1285), called the Bold (Note: Hallam states Philip gained his nickname sometime before 1300, due to his prowess in Tunis or Spain. Bradbury states it was Philip's distinct policies and how he implemented them that gained him his nickname.) (French: le Hardi), was King of France from 1270 until his death in 1285. His father, Louis IX, died in Tunis during the Eighth Crusade. Philip, who was accompanying him, returned to France and was anointed king at Reims in 1271.

Philip inherited numerous territorial lands during his reign, the most notable being the County of Toulouse, which was annexed to the royal domain in 1271. With the Treaty of Orléans, he expanded French influence into the Kingdom of Navarre and following the death of his brother Peter during the war of the Sicilian Vespers, the County of Alençon was returned to the crown lands.

Following the War of the Sicilian Vespers, Philip led the Aragonese Crusade in support of his uncle, Charles I of Naples. Philip was initially successful, but his army was racked with sickness and he was forced to retreat. He died from dysentery in Perpignan in 1285 at the age of 40. He was succeeded by his son Philip IV.

== Early life ==
Philip was born in Poissy on 1 May 1245, the second son of King Louis IX of France and Margaret of Provence. As a younger son, Philip was not expected to rule France. At the death of his older brother Louis in 1260, he became the heir apparent to the throne.

Philip's mother Margaret made him promise to remain under her tutelage until the age of 30; however, Pope Urban IV released him from this oath on 6 June 1263. From that moment on, Pierre de la Broce, a royal favourite and household official of Louis IX, was Philip's mentor. His father, Louis, also provided him with advice, writing in particular the Enseignements, which inculcated the notion of justice as the first duty of a king.

According to the terms of the Treaty of Corbeil (1258), concluded on 11 March 1258 between Louis IX and James I of Aragon, Philip was married in 1262 to Isabella of Aragon in Clermont by the archbishop of Rouen, Eudes Rigaud.

Philip was knighted by his father on 5 June 1267.

== Crusade ==
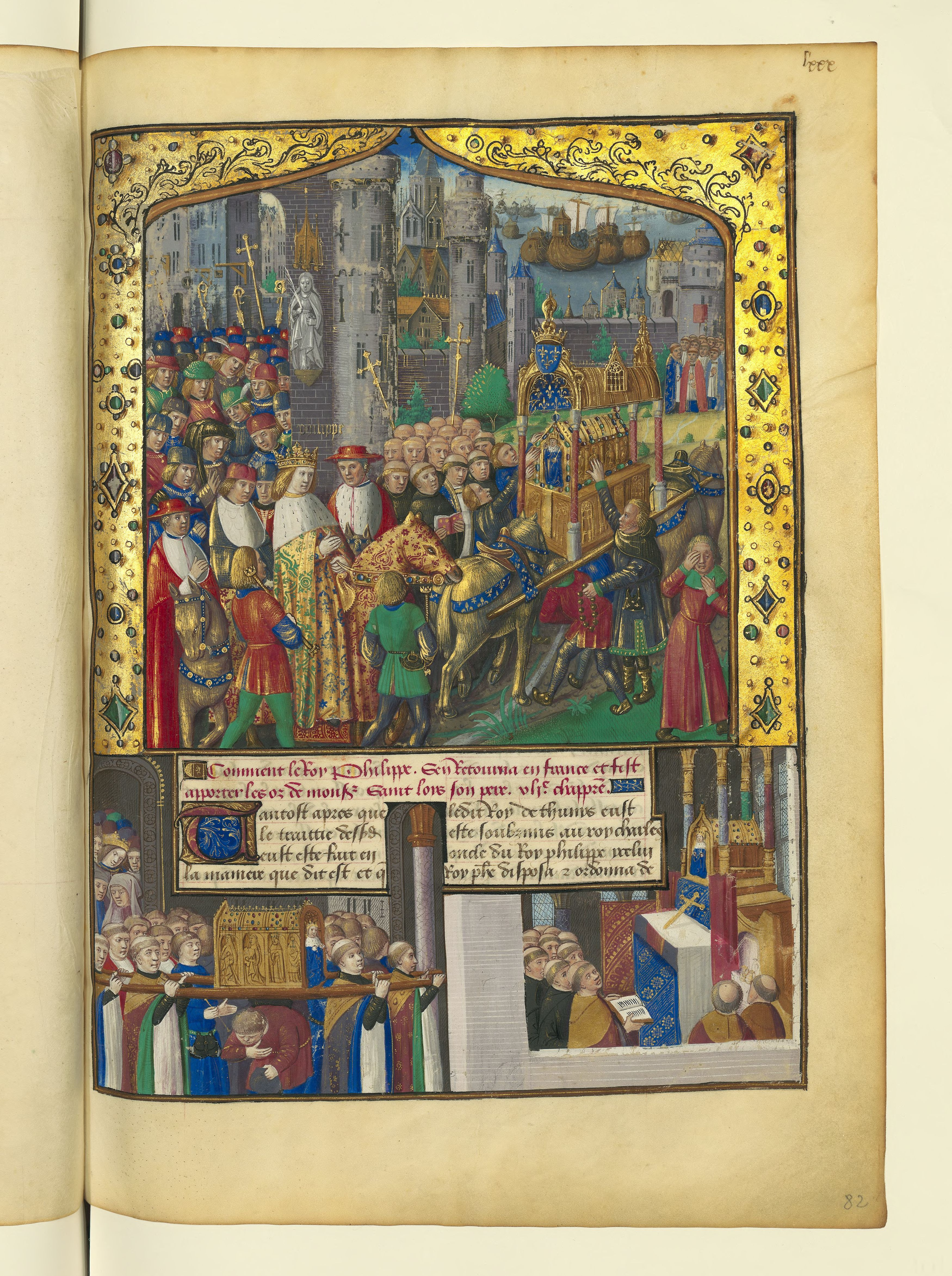
Philip (on horseback) has his father's remains returned to France. Late 15th century illuminated manuscript

As Count of Orléans, Philip accompanied his father on the Eighth Crusade to Tunis in 1270. Shortly before his departure, Louis IX had given the regency of the kingdom into the hands of Mathieu de Vendôme and Simon II, Count of Clermont, to whom he had also entrusted the royal seal. After taking Carthage, the army was struck by an epidemic of dysentery, which spared neither Philip nor his family. His brother John Tristan, Count of Valois died first, on 3 August, and on 25 August the King died. (Note: The disease in question was either dysentery or typhus.) To prevent putrefaction of his remains, it was decided to carry out mos Teutonicus, the process of rendering the flesh from the bones so as to make transporting the remains feasible.

Philip, only 25 years old and stricken with dysentery, was proclaimed king in Tunis. His uncle, Charles I of Naples, negotiated with Muhammad I al-Mustansir, Hafsid Caliph of Tunis. A treaty was concluded 5 November 1270 between the kings of France, Sicily and Navarre and the Caliph of Tunis.

Other deaths followed this debacle. In December, in Trapani, Sicily, Philip's brother-in-law, King Theobald II of Navarre, died. He was followed in February by Philip's wife, Isabella, who fell off her horse while pregnant with their fifth child. She died in Cosenza (Calabria). In April, Theobald's widow and Philip's sister, Isabella, also died.

Philip III arrived in Paris on 21 May 1271, and paid tribute to the deceased. The next day the funeral of his father was held. The new sovereign was crowned king of France in Reims on 15 August 1271.

== Reign ==
Philip maintained most of his father's domestic policies. This included the royal ordinances passed against seigneurial warfare by his father in 1258, which he reinforced by passing his own ordinance in October 1274. Philip followed in his father's footsteps concerning Jews in France, claiming piety as his motivation. Upon his return to Paris 23 September 1271, Philip reenacted his father's order that Jews wear badges. His charter in 1283 banned the construction and repair of synagogues and Jewish cemeteries, banned Jews from employing Christians, and sought to restrain Jewish strepiti (chanting too loudly).

On 21 August 1271, Philip's uncle, Alphonse, Count of Poitiers and Toulouse, died childless in Savona. Philip inherited Alphonse's lands and united them with the royal domain. This inheritance included a portion of Auvergne, later the Duchy of Auvergne and the Agenais. In accordance with the wishes of Alphonse, Philip granted the Comtat Venaissin to Pope Gregory X in 1274. Several years later the Treaty of Amiens (1279) with King Edward I restored Agenais to the English.

On 19 September 1271, Philip commanded the Seneschal of Toulouse to record oaths of loyalty from nobles and town councils. The following year, Roger-Bernard III, Count of Foix, invaded the County of Toulouse, killed several royal officials, and captured the town of Sombuy. Philip's royal seneschal, Eustache de Beaumarchès, led a counter-attack into the County of Foix, until ordered by Philip to withdraw. Philip and his army arrived at Toulouse on 25 May 1272, and on 1 June at Boulbonne met James I of Aragon, who attempted to mediate the issue, but this was rejected by Roger-Bernard. Philip then proceeded on a campaign to devastate and depopulate the County of Foix. By 5 June Roger-Bernard had surrendered, was incarcerated at Carcassonne, and placed in chains. Philip imprisoned him for a year, but then freed him and restored his lands.

== Treaty with Navarre ==
Following the death of King Henry I of Navarre in 1274, Alfonso X of Castile attempted to gain the crown of Navarre from Henry's heiress, Joan. Ferdinand de la Cerda, the son of Alfonso X, arrived at Viana with an army. At the same time, Alfonso sought papal approval for a marriage between one of his grandsons and Joan. Henry's widow, Blanche of Artois, was also receiving marriage proposals for Joan from England and Aragon. Faced with an invading army and foreign proposals, Blanche sought assistance from her cousin, Philip. Philip saw a territorial gain, while Joan would have the military assistance to protect her kingdom. The Treaty of Orléans of 1275, between Philip and Blanche, arranged the marriage between a son of Philip (Louis or Philip) and Blanche's daughter, Joan. The treaty indicated that Navarre would be administered from Paris by appointed governors. By May 1276, French governors were traveling throughout Navarre collecting oaths of fealty to the young Queen. The Navarrese populace, unhappy with the pro-French treaty and French governors, formed two rebellious factions, one pro-Castilian, the other pro-Aragonese.

=== Navarrese revolt ===
In September 1276, Philip, faced with open rebellion, sent Robert II, Count of Artois to Pamplona with an army. Philip arrived in Bearn in November 1276 with another army, by which time Robert had pacified the situation and extracted oaths of homage from Navarrese nobles and castellans. Despite the revolt being quickly pacified, it was not until the spring of 1277 that the Kingdoms of Castile and Aragon renounced their intentions of matrimony. Philip received a formal rebuke from Pope Nicholas III for the damage inflicted throughout Navarre.

== Sicilian Vespers ==
In 1282, Sicily rose in revolt against King Charles I of Naples, Philip's uncle. Angered by years of heavy taxation, Sicilian mobs massacred many Angevins and French. King Peter III of Aragon subsequently landed on Sicily in support of the rebels, claiming the crown of Sicily for himself. The success of the rebellion and invasion led to the coronation of Peter as king of Sicily on 4 September 1282. Pope Martin IV excommunicated Peter and declared his kingdom forfeit. Martin then granted Aragon to Philip's son, Charles, Count of Valois. Philip's brother, Peter, Count of Perche, who had joined Charles to suppress the rebellion, was killed in Reggio Calabria. He died without issue and the County of Alençon returned to the royal domain in 1286.

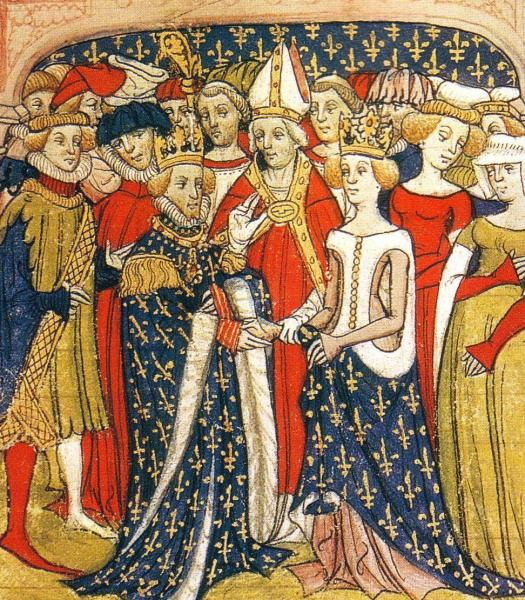
Marriage of Philip and Marie of Brabant, Queen of France. Royal MS 20 C VII, 14th century.

=== Aragonese Crusade and death ===
Philip, at the urging of his wife, Marie of Brabant, and his uncle, Charles of Naples, launched a war against the Kingdom of Aragon. The war took the name "Aragonese Crusade" from its papal sanction; nevertheless, one historian labelled it "perhaps the most unjust, unnecessary and calamitous enterprise ever undertaken by the Capetian monarchy." Philip, accompanied by his sons, entered Roussillon at the head of a large army. By 26 June 1285, he had entrenched his army before Girona and besieged the city. Despite strong resistance, Philip took Girona on 7 September 1285. Philip quickly experienced a reversal, as an epidemic of dysentery hit the French camp and afflicted Philip personally. The French had started a withdrawal when the Aragonese attacked and easily defeated the former at the Battle of the Col de Panissars on 1 October. Philip died of dysentery in Perpignan on 5 October 1285. His son, Philip the Fair, succeeded him as king of France. Following the mos Teutonicus custom, his body was divided in several parts, each buried in different places; the flesh was sent to the Narbonne Cathedral, the entrails to La Noë Abbey in Normandy, his heart to the now-demolished Church of the Couvent des Jacobins in Paris and his bones to Basilica of Saint-Denis, north of Paris.

== Marriages and children ==
On 28 May 1262, Philip married Isabella, daughter of King James I of Aragon and his second wife Violant of Hungary. They had the following children:

1. Louis (1264 – May 1276).
2. Philip IV of France (1268 – 29 November 1314), his successor, married Joan I of Navarre
3. Robert (1269–1271)
4. Charles (12 March 1270 – 16 December 1325), Count of Valois from 1284, married first to Margaret of Naples (Countess of Anjou) in 1290, second to Catherine I of Courtenay in 1302, and last to Mahaut of Chatillon in 1308
5. Stillborn son (January 1271)

After the death of Queen Isabella, Philip married on 21 August 1274 Marie, daughter of the late Henry III, Duke of Brabant, and Adelaide of Burgundy, Duchess of Brabant. Their children were:

1. Louis (May 1276 – 19 May 1319), Count of Évreux from 1298, married Margaret of Artois
2. Blanche (1278 – 19 March 1305, Vienna), married Duke, the future king Rudolf I of Bohemia and Poland, on 25 May 1300.
3. Margaret (c.1277/1279 – 14 February 1318), married King Edward I of England on 8 September 1299

== Legacy ==
During Philip's reign the royal domain expanded, acquiring the County of Guînes in 1281, the County of Toulouse in 1271, the County of Alençon in 1286, the Duchy of Auvergne in 1271, and through the marriage of his son Philip, the Kingdom of Navarre. He largely continued his father's policies and left his father's administrators in place. His attempt to conquer Aragon nearly bankrupted the French monarchy, causing financial challenges for his successor.

== Review from Dante ==
In the Divine Comedy, the Italian poet Dante envisions the spirit of Philip outside the gates of Purgatory with a number of other contemporary European rulers. Dante does not name Philip directly, but refers to him as "the small-nosed" and "the father of the Pest of France", a reference to King Philip IV of France.

== Sources ==
- Alighieri, Dante (1920). The Divine Comedy. Translated by Norton, Charles Eliot. Houghton Mifflin Company.
- Aurell, Jaume (2020). Medieval Self-Coronations: The History and Symbolism of a Ritual. Cambridge University Press. ISBN 978-1-10884-024-8.
- Biller, Peter; Bruschi, C.; Sneddon, S., eds. (2011). Inquisitors and Heretics in Thirteenth-Century Languedoc: Edition and Translation of Toulouse Inquisition Depositions, 1273–1282. Brill. ISBN 978-9-00418-810-5.
- Bradbury, Jim (2007). The Capetians: Kings of France 987–1328. Continuum. ISBN 978-1-85285-528-4.
- Brown, Elizabeth A. R. (1978). The Monarchy of Capetian France and Royal Ceremonial. Variorum Reprints. ISBN 978-0-86078-279-7.
- Brown, Elizabeth A. R. (2017). "Philip the Fair's Sons, Their Statuses, and Their Landed Endowments". Medieval Prosopography. 32: 186–227.
- Chaytor, H.J. (1933). A History of Aragon and Catalonia. Methuen Publishing Ltd. OCLC 315938869.
- Chazan, Robert, ed. (1980). Church, State, and Jew in the Middle Ages. Behrman House, Inc. ISBN 0-8744-1302-8.
- Chazan, Robert (2019). Medieval Jewry in Northern France: A Political and Social History. The Johns Hopkins University Press. ISBN 978-1-42143-065-2.
- Dunbabin, Jean (2011). The French in the Kingdom of Sicily, 1266–1305. Cambridge University Press. ISBN 978-0-52119-878-3.
- Earenfight, Theresa (2013). Queenship in Medieval Europe. Palgrave Macmillan. ISBN 978-0-23027-645-1.
- Evergates, Theodore (1999). "Aristocratic Women in the County of Champagne". In Evergates, Theodore (ed.). Aristocratic Women in Medieval France. University of Pennsylvania Press. ISBN 0-8122-3503-7.
- Fawtier, Robert (1989). Capetian Kings of France: Monarchy and Nation, 987–1328 (17th ed.). Macmillan. ISBN 978-0-33308-721-3.
- Field, Sean L. (2019). Courting Sanctity: Holy Women and the Capetians. Cornell University Press. ISBN 978-1-50173-619-3.
- Firnhaber-Baker, Justine (2014). Violence and the State in Languedoc, 1250–1400. Cambridge University Press.
- Giesey, Ralph E. (2004). Rulership in France, 15th–17th Centuries. Ashgate. ISBN 978-0-86078-920-8.
- Gil, Christiane (2006). Marguerite de Provence: épouse de Saint Louis (in French). Pygmalion. ISBN 978-2-75640-000-6.
- Hallam, Elizabeth M. (1980). Capetian France: 987–1328. Longman. ISBN 978-0-58240-428-1.
- Henneman, John Bell (1971). Royal Taxation in Fourteenth-Century France: The Development of War Financing, 1322–1359. Princeton University Press. ISBN 0-6910-5188-7.
- Jordan, William Chester (2009). A Tale of Two Monasteries: Westminster and Saint-Denis in the Thirteenth Century. Princeton University Press. ISBN 978-0-69113-901-2.
- Le Goff, Jacques (2009). Saint Louis. University of Notre Dame Press. ISBN 978-0-26803-381-1.
- Lower, Michael (2018). The Tunis Crusade of 1270: A Mediterranean History. Oxford University Press. ISBN 978-0-19874-432-0.
- Morrison, Elizabeth; Hedeman, Anne Dawson, eds. (2010). Imagining the Past in France: History in Manuscript Painting, 1250–1500. J. Paul Getty Museum. ISBN 978-1-60606-028-5.
- Peter of Ickham (1865) [c. 1218-1237]. Glover, John (ed.). Le Livere de Reis de Brittanie E Le Livere de Reis de Engleterre. Rolls Series (in French). Cambridge University Press. OCLC 1143197992. OL 20614714M.
- de Pontfarcy, Yolanda (2010). "Philip III". In Lansing, Richard (ed.). The Dante Encyclopedia. Routledge. ISBN 978-0-41587-611-7.
- Prestwich, Michael (2007). Plantagenet England 1225–1360. Oxford University Press. ISBN 978-0-19922-687-0.
- Richard, Jean (1992). Lloyd, Simon (ed.). Saint Louis: Crusader King of France. Translated by Birrell, Jean. Cambridge University Press. ISBN 978-0-52138-156-7.
- Runciman, Steven (2000). The Sicilian Vespers: A History of the Mediterranean World in the Later Thirteenth Century. Cambridge University Press. ISBN 978-0-52143-774-5.
- Riley-Smith, Jonathan (2005). The Crusades: A History. Continuum. ISBN 978-1-47251-351-9.
- Sammartino, Peter; Roberts, William (1992). Sicily: An Informal History. Cornwall Books. ISBN 978-0-84534-877-2.
- Sibley, W.A.; Sibley, M.D. (2003). The Chronicle of William of Puylaurens: The Albigensian Crusade and Its Aftermath. The Boydell Press. ISBN 0-8511-5925-7.
- Sivery, Gerard (2003). Philippe III Le Hardi. Fayard. ISBN 2-2136-1486-5.
- Stow, Kenneth (2006). Jewish Dogs: An Image and Its Interpreters. Stanford University Press. ISBN 978-0-80475-281-7.
- Sumption, Jonathan (1990). The Hundred Years War:Trial by Battle. Vol. I. Faber and Faber Limited. ISBN 978-0-81221-655-4.
- Tyerman, Christopher (2019). The World of the Crusades. Yale University Press. ISBN 978-0-30021-739-1.
- Ward, Jennifer (2016). Women in Medieval Europe 1200–1500 (2nd ed.). Routledge. ISBN 978-1-13885-568-7.
- Westerhof, Danielle (2008). Death and the Noble Body in Medieval England. Boydell Press. ISBN 978-1-84383-416-8.
- Wood, Charles T. (1966). The French Apanages and the Capetian Monarchy, 1224–1328. Harvard University Press. ISBN 978-0-67432-001-7.
- Woodacre, Elena (2013). The Queens Regnant of Navarre. Palgrave Macmillan. ISBN 978-1-13733-914-0.

Philip III of France House of Capet Born: 1 May 1245 Died: 5 October 1285
Regnal titles
Preceded by Louis IX	King of France; 25 August 1270 – 5 October 1285	Succeeded by Philip IV
