= Cordeliers Convent =

Former convent in Paris, France

Coordinates: 48°51′02″N 02°20′28.69″E

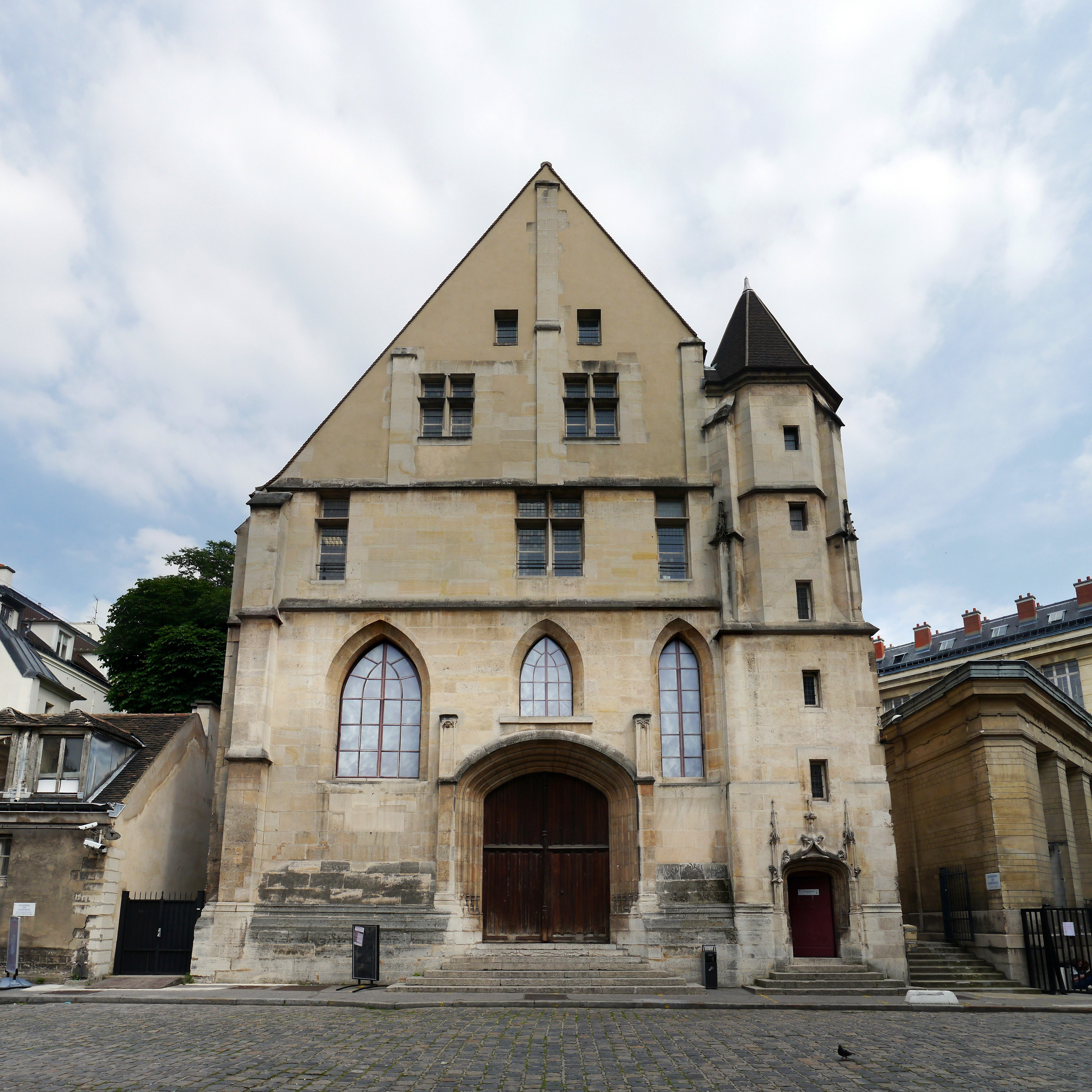
The refectory of the Cordeliers Convent, in Paris, the only remaining part of the convent, photographed in 2012. It is now classified as a monument historique

There were several Cordeliers Convents (French: Couvent des Cordeliers) in France. Cordeliers was the name given in France to the Conventual Franciscans.

== Cordeliers Convent in Paris ==
The Cordeliers Convent in Paris is located 15 rue de l'École de Médecine in the 6th arrondissement of the capital.

The Cordeliers Convent in Paris was built during the 13th century. It served as a school of theology, a care center and a church. It was nationalized in 1790 and became the home the eponymous Club of the Cordeliers, which held its first meetings there during the French Revolution. The group was evicted from the building on 17 May 1791. The building later housed the Dupuytren Museum of anatomy in connection with the school of medicine, until 2016. It became a monument historique in 1905.

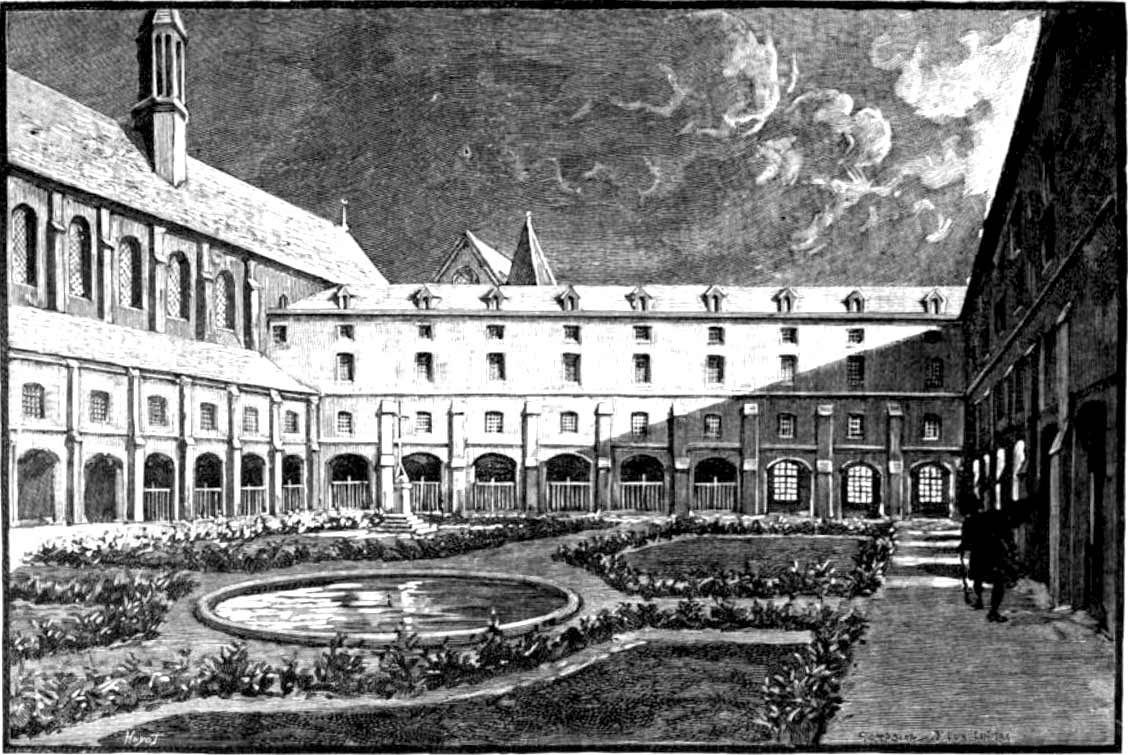
The Cordeliers Convent, in Paris, during the French Revolution, in a late 19th-century illustration

=== Burials at the convent in Paris ===
- Arthur II, Duke of Brittany
- Blanche of France, Infanta of Castile
- Joan I of Navarre, Queen of France and Navarre
- Marie of Brabant, Queen of France
- Joan II, Countess of Burgundy, Queen of France

== Other Cordeliers Convents ==
- The convent in Auxerre, originally also used as the Hôtel de Ville
- The convent in Draguignan, now forms part of the Hôtel de Ville
- The convent in Forcalquier, now occupied by the Université Européenne des Senteurs & Saveurs
- The convent in Montélimar, now demolished and replaced by the Hôtel de Ville
- The convent in Pontoise, now demolished and replaced by the Hôtel de Ville
- The convent in Romans-sur-Isère, now demolished and replaced by the Hôtel de Ville

== Sources ==
- Gaude-Ferragu, Murielle (2016). Queenship in Medieval France, 1300-1500. Palgrave Macmillan.
