= Marius Moutet =

French diplomat (1876–1968)

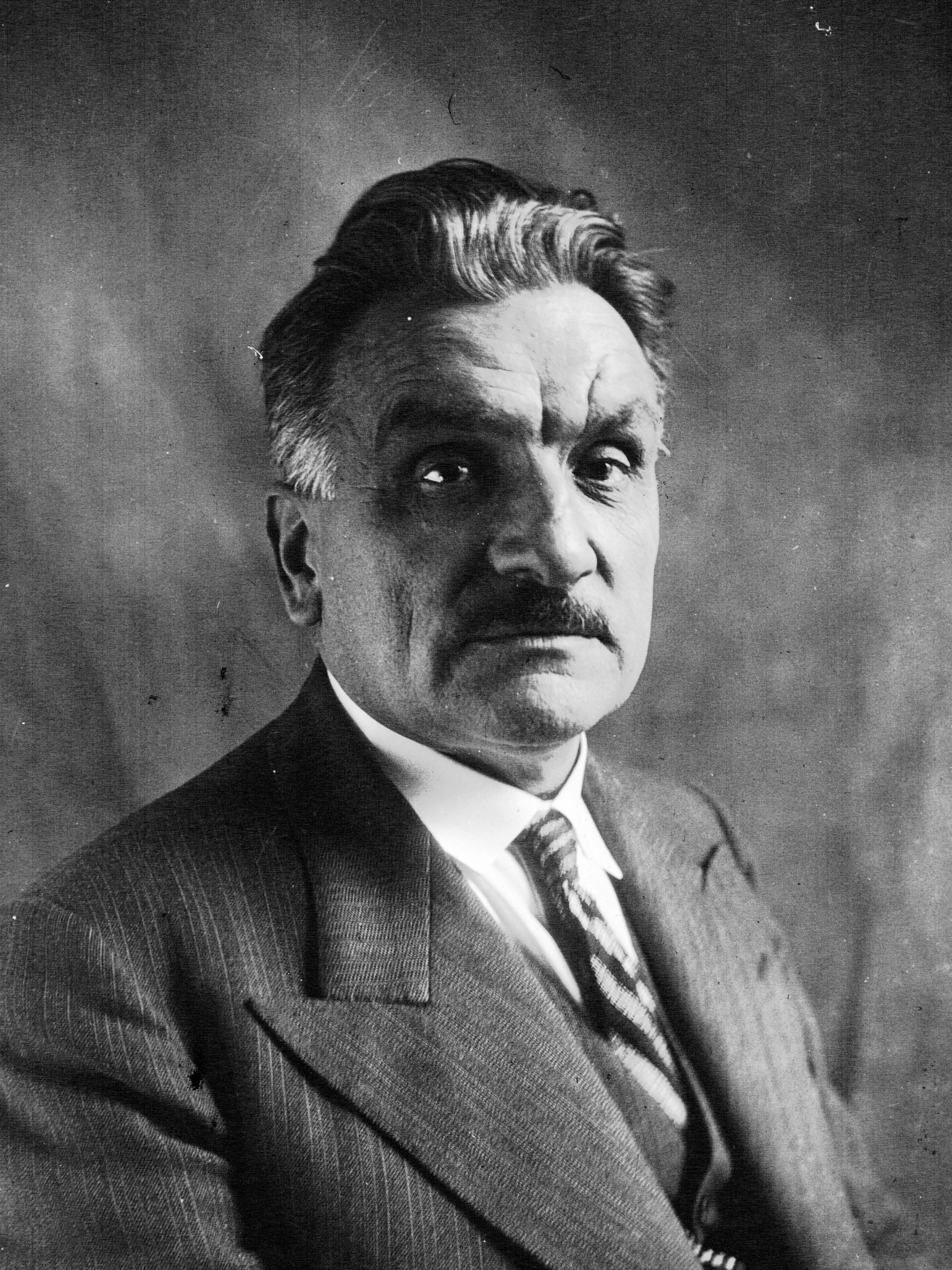
- Moutet in 1933

Minister of the Colonies
- In office 13 March 1938 – 10 April 1938
- Prime Minister: Camille Chautemps; Léon Blum
- Preceded by: Théodore Steeg
- Succeeded by: Georges Mandel
- In office 4 June 1936 – 18 January 1938
- Prime Minister: Léon Blum; Camille Chautemps
- Preceded by: Jacques Stern
- Succeeded by: Théodore Steeg

Member of the Chamber of Deputies
- In office July 1914 – 1928
- Constituency: Lyon, Vaise
- In office 13 January 1929 – ?
- Preceded by: Jules Nadi
- Constituency: Drôme

Personal details
- Born: 19 April 1876 Nîmes, France
- Died: 29 October 1968 (aged 92) Paris, France
- Party: Independent Socialists; French Section of the Workers' International
- Other political affiliations: Popular Front
- Education: Lycee of Macon; Lycee Henri IV
- Profession: Lawyer

Marius Moutet (19 April 1876 – 29 October 1968) was a French Socialist diplomat and colonial adviser. An expert in colonial issues, he served as Minister of the Colonies for four terms in the 1930s and 1940s and was president of the General council of the Drôme department after the war until 1951. He was sympathetic to Ho Chi Minh and advocated the independence of Vietnam. At the age of 92, Moutet was the oldest member of the Senate of France and the French Assembly.

== Early years ==
Moutet was born in Nîmes, Gard in 1876. He came from a mixed Protestant-Catholic family of Rhône valley wine merchants. He studied at the Lycée of Macon and then at the Lycée Henri IV, in Paris. He was a member of the Socialist Students in Lyon, and the Independent Socialists in 1895.

== Career ==
After becoming a lawyer, he was a delegate from the Rhône department to the second organization of French socialists' congress held in Wagram in September 1900. Five years later, he was a delegate from the same department to the founding convention of the French Section of the Workers' International.

In July 1914, with the support of Jean Jaurès during his candidacy, Moutet was elected as a member of the Chamber of Deputies, representing the Vaise neighbourhood of Lyon. During the First World War, in May 1917, he was appointed by Aristide Briand to convince the new Russian government, led by Alexander Kerensky, to continue the war on the side of France and Britain. The same year, he supported Joseph Caillaux before the High Court of Justice.

Moutet was a member of the Central Committee of the International Federation for Human Rights in 1918–1936, as Honorary Minister 1936–1939, 1939–1940, 1945–1947. He was re-elected deputy again for Rhône in 1919 and 1924, but was defeated in 1928 by the Republican-Socialist Party candidate. On 13 January 1929, he was elected to represent the Drôme department, replacing Jules Nadi, who had died. He became a specialist on questions related to the French colonial empire, advocating a generous policy of assimilation, opposing brutal repression and condescending paternalism. He was an advocate for independence in Vietnam and friendly towards Ho Chi Minh.

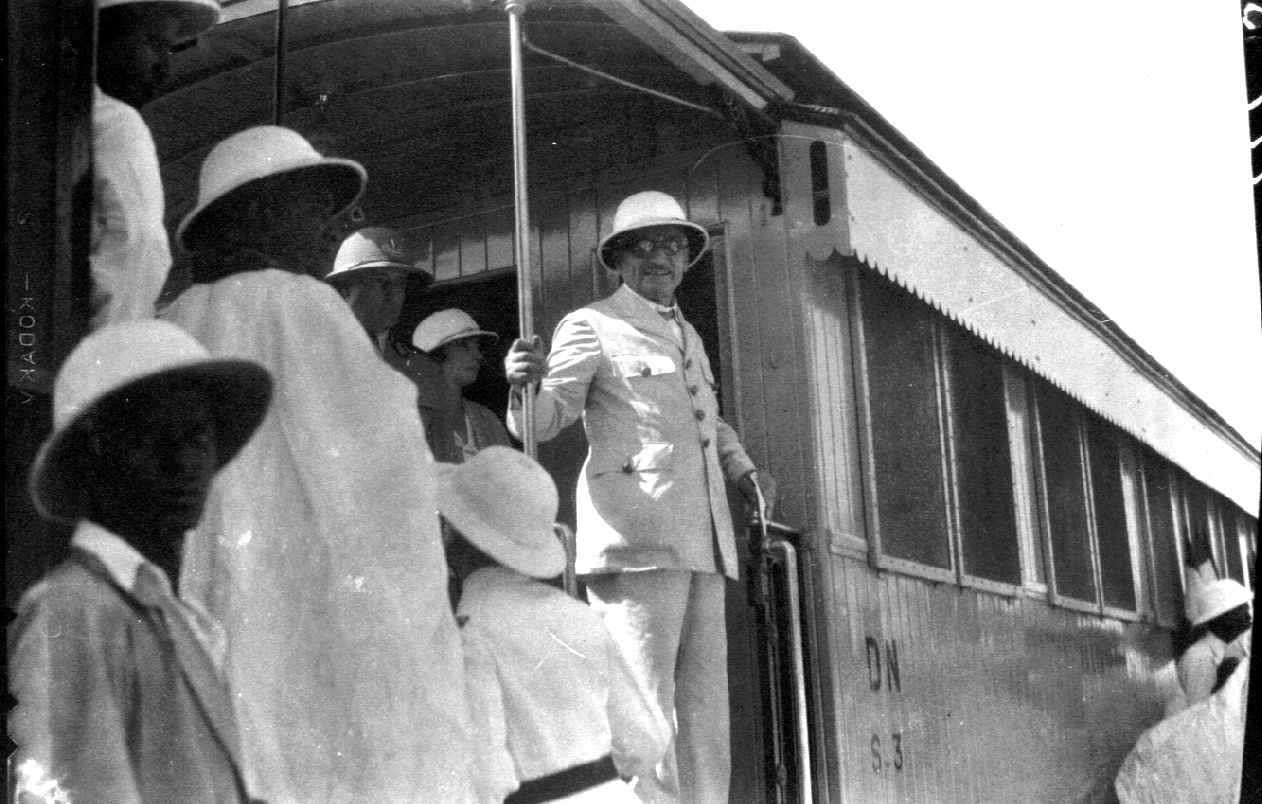
Moutet, serving in Leon Blum's cabinet while in Dakar, 1937

Moutet served as Minister of the Colonies in the Popular Front governments of 1936 to 1938 under Léon Blum government and Camille Chautemps. Moutet later expressed criticism of the Popular Front. Moutet faced difficult colonial issues such as removing the prisons in French Guiana. To improve the plight of colonized peoples, he removed the Indigénat Code of its substance in the years 1936 and 1937, and completely repealed it on 6 April 1938. He ordered the colonial administrators to view famine not as inevitable but as a scourge to be combated following the survey from June 1936 to February 1937. He stepped up initiatives to associate the colonized people to the administration within their territory. He called for the first time that a black resident, Félix Éboué, become Governor of the Guadeloupe and the French Equatorial Africa. He voted for amnesty and the independence of Vietnam.

On 14 May 1939, at the Congress of the federation of French Section of the Workers' International which met at Drôme, he stated that "every concession (to the Axis Powers) brings us closer to war." Moutet was one of the Eighty, a group of deputies who refused to grant full authority to Philippe Pétain on 10 July 1940. He subsequently went underground and took refuge in Switzerland from 1941 to avoid arrest, with one of his sons being confined to his place in Vals-les-Bains by the Vichy government in retaliation.

At the end of the war, he was re-elected to the Drôme department in the two Constitutional conventions in 1945, and was elected to the Council of the Republic. He was president of the General council of Drôme until 1951. He held the Minister of Overseas France position under Félix Gouin, Georges Bidault, Blum's third government, and Paul Ramadier. He negotiated with Ho Chi Minh and founded Le fonds d'investissement des départements d'outre-mer (FIDOM) (Investment Fund for Economic and Social territories overseas). From 1947, he was in the French Sudan, and that year he attempted to pass the Code du travail by decree before he left office in November. As a parliamentarian, he worked for peace in the Parliamentary Assembly of the Council of Europe, the Assembly of the Western European Union and the Inter-Parliamentary Union. He served for the Drôme department from 1948, first in the Council of the Republic under the Fourth Republic, and then in the Senate under the Fifth Republic up his death.

At the age of 92, Moutet was the oldest member of the Senate of France and the French Assembly. At the initiative of Jean Besson, senator from the Drôme, the Cahier de l'Institut Marius Moutet – Centre d'histoire de Sciences Po is an institute of contemporary history that bears his name. Freddy Martin-Rosset, mayor of Épinouze, published a biography covering Moutet's political career in the Drôme, L'itinéraire politique drômois de Marius Moutet (2012).

== Personal life ==
Moutet was twice married. His first wife was Anna Matoussevitch (d. 1926), a Russian from Minsk, whom he met in Lyon where she was studying medicine; they had two sons, Jacques Moutet (1900–1951) and Gustave Moutet (1901–1987), and a daughter, Marianne Moutet Basch (1904–2000). His second wife was Magdeleine Vérilhac (d. 1975); they had a son, Philippe Moutet (1928–2003). Moutet also had two other children, Michel Moutet and Aimée Moutet. Anne-Elisabeth Moutet is his granddaughter.

== Bibliography ==
- Binot, J.-M.; Lefebvre, D.; Serne, P. (2005). 100 ans, 100 socialistes (in French). Paris: Leprince.
- Delavignette, Robert (1981). "La politique de Marius Moutet au ministère des colonies". In Rémond, R.; Renouvin, P. (eds.). Léon Blum chef de gouvernement: 1936–1937 (in French). Paris: Presses de la Fondation Nationale des Sciences Politiques. p. 392. ISBN 2724601998.
- Fremigacci, Jean (March 2007). "La vérité sur la grande révolte de Madagascar". L'Histoire (in French). 318.
- Lewis, James I. (2008). "The Tragic Career of Marius Moutet". European History Quarterly. 38 (1): 66–92. doi:10.1177/0265691407084462. S2CID 143918026.
- Martin-Rosset, Freddy (2012). L'itinéraire politique drômois de Marius Moutet; édition de l'OURS (Office Universitaire de Recherche Socialiste), 12, cité Malesherbes, 75009 Paris. ISBN 978-2-911518-04-1 (in French)
