= Clergerie =

Clergerie is a surname. Notable people with the surname include:

- Pierre Clergerie, French rower
- Robert Clergerie, French shoe designer
