= Church of Saint-Eusèbe, Auxerre =

Roman Catholic church in Auxerre, France

Church of Saint-Eusèbe
- French: Église Saint-Eusèbe d'Auxerre
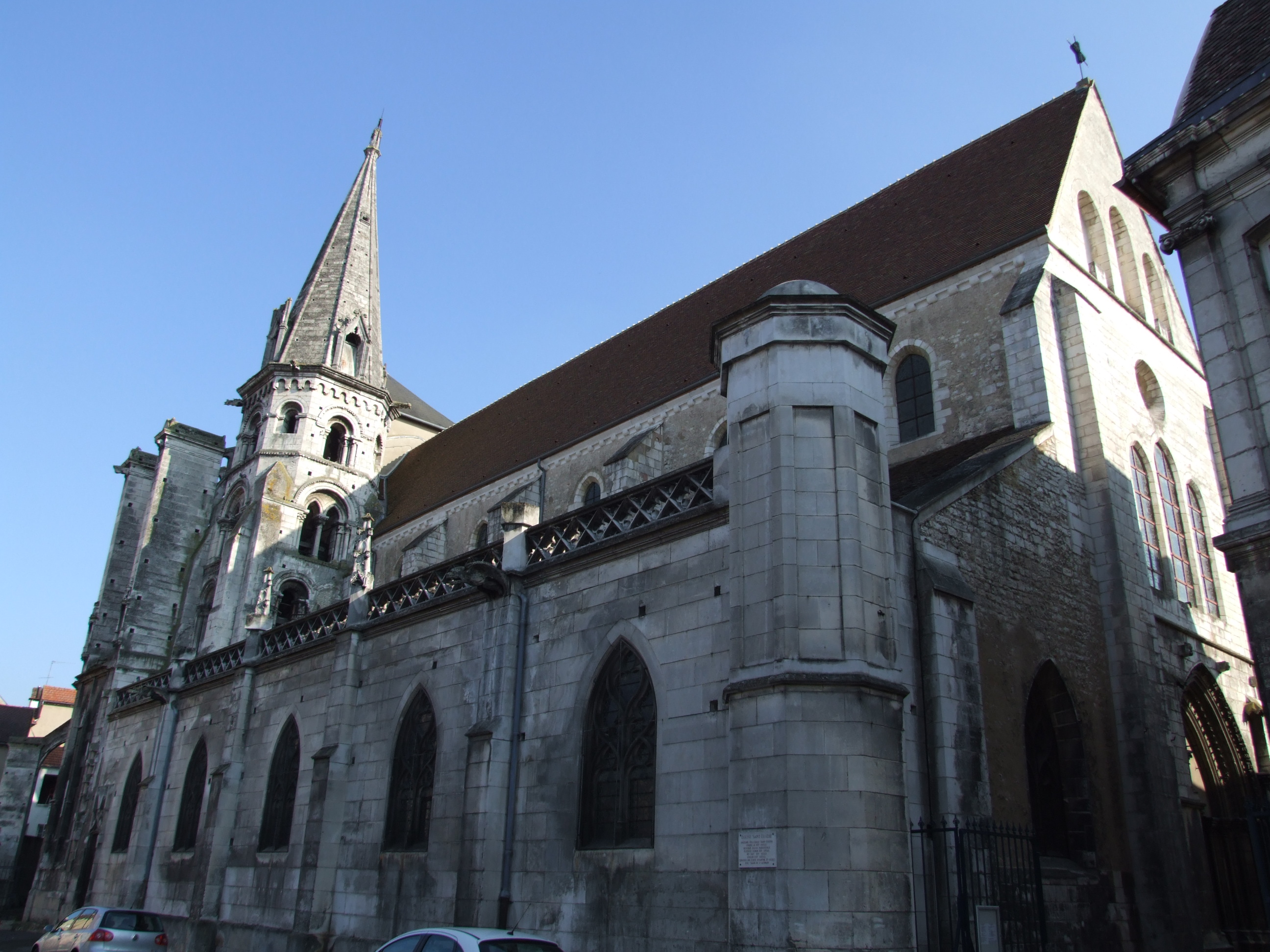

- Location within Bourgogne-Franche-Comté
- 47°47′40″N 3°34′03″E
- Location: Auxerre, Yonne
- Country: France
- Denomination: Roman Catholic

History
- Status: Church
- Dedication: Saint Eusebius

Architecture
- Functional status: Active
- Architectural type: Church
- Style: Romanesque
- Groundbreaking: 12th century
- Completed: 16th century

Administration
- Archdiocese: Sens-Auxerre

Monument historique
- Official name: Eglise Saint-Eusèbe
- Criteria: Class MH
- Designated: 1862
- Reference no.: PA00113587

The Church of Saint-Eusèbe is a Roman Catholic church in Auxerre, France. It belongs to the monastery of Saint-Eusèbe founded by Saint Palladius, the Bishop of Auxerre from 622 to 657. The church was listed as a Class Historic Monument in 1862.

== Location ==
The church is located on Rue Saint-Eusèbe in Auxerre, around 150 m southeast from the 3rd-century fortification that surrounded the city at that time. It was included in the city with the construction of the second wall by Peter II of Courtenay in 1196.

== History ==
In 637 or around 640, Bishop of Auxerre Saint Palladius founded a monastery dedicated to Saint Eusebius of Vercelli outside of the walls surrounding the city. The monastery was often attacked, wrecked or even destroyed, so the monks left it and the monastery became a property of Auxerre Cathedral.

In 1090 or 1100, Bishop Humbaud increased the number of monks in the monastery and made the community regular by introducing canons from Saint-Laurent-lès-Cosne Abbey. In this way, Saint-Eusèbe became a priory affiliated with Saint-Laurent-lès-Cosne. The canons regular of Saint-Laurent re-built the monastery's buildings and turned the church into a parish seat around 1130.

The monastery was successively ruined, re-built and partly set on fire in 1216.

On June 12, 1384, Bishop of Auxerre Ferric Cassinel consecrated the church, which had been used without consecration for more than a century.

In 1523, the apse of the church collapsed due to a lack of maintenance. Its re-construction started in 1530, maybe as a part of a reconstruction project of the whole church. The new apse was built in the Renaissance style. The glass walls were remarked, notably the ones of the 1530 axial chapel dedicated to the Virgin Mary as well as the ones of the ambulatory which show the story of saint Laurent, the secondary patron saint of the church. New stained glass windows were installed in the church, but they were destroyed during the occupation of the city by the Protestants in 1567–8. New stained glasses were installed, but they were damaged with time.

The portal was built in 1633. However, the Wars of Religion in the second half of the 17th century definitely stopped the works. In 1634, the priory of Saint-Eusèbe was affiliated with the canons regular of Sainte-Geneviève of Paris, who repaired and embellished the church. In the 18th century, the few canons remaining sold their land as separate plots, where private houses were built.

The church of Saint-Eusèbe was listed as a Class Historic Monument in 1862.

== Architecture ==
The nave was reworked from the 13th to the 15th century. It is adjacent to a Romanesque bell tower of the 12th century similar to that of the Abbey of Saint-Germain d'Auxerre. The choir was re-built in the 16th century and is higher than the nave.

The portal built in 1633 has two panels: the right panel shows Saint Eusebius, while the left panel shows Saint Laurent. Statues of both saints are located on both sides of the entrance of the axial chapel.

== Relics ==
The church hosts the relics of a 9th-century Byzantine cloth named the Shroud of Saint Germain (suaire de saint Germain in French), as well as wood paintings of the Italian school of the 15th to 18th centuries.

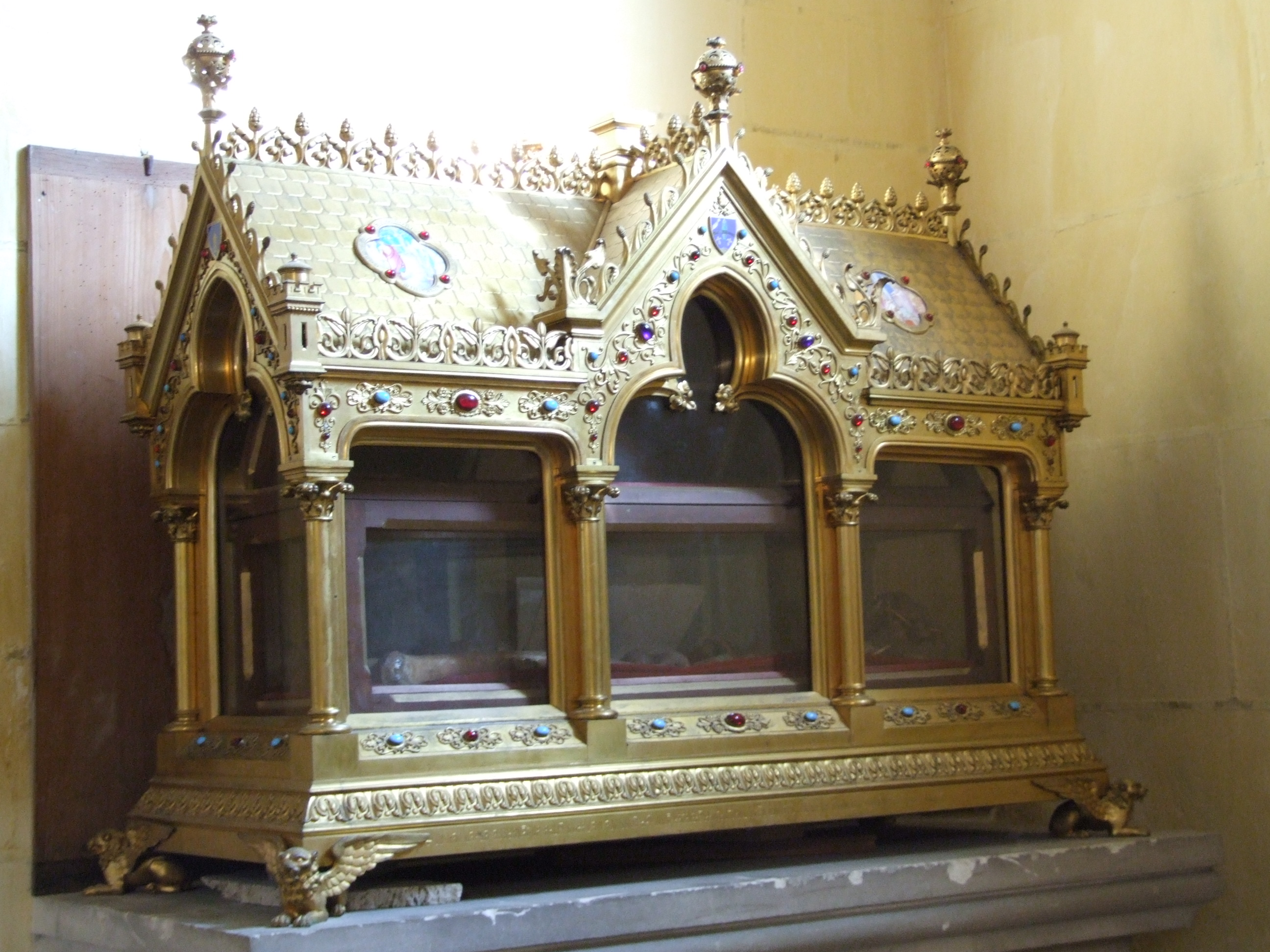
The reliquary of Saint-Eusèbe

== Gallery ==
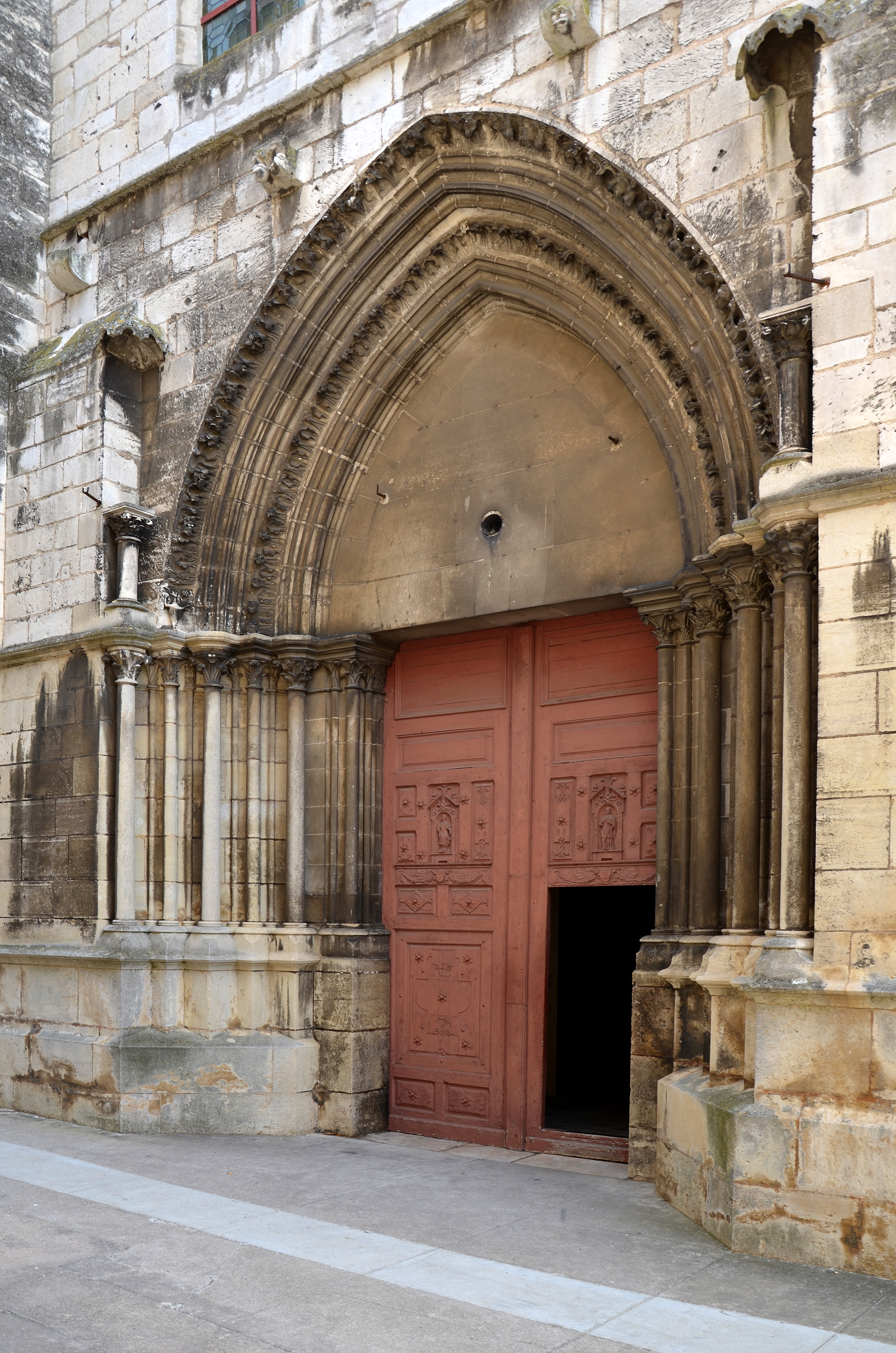
Porch

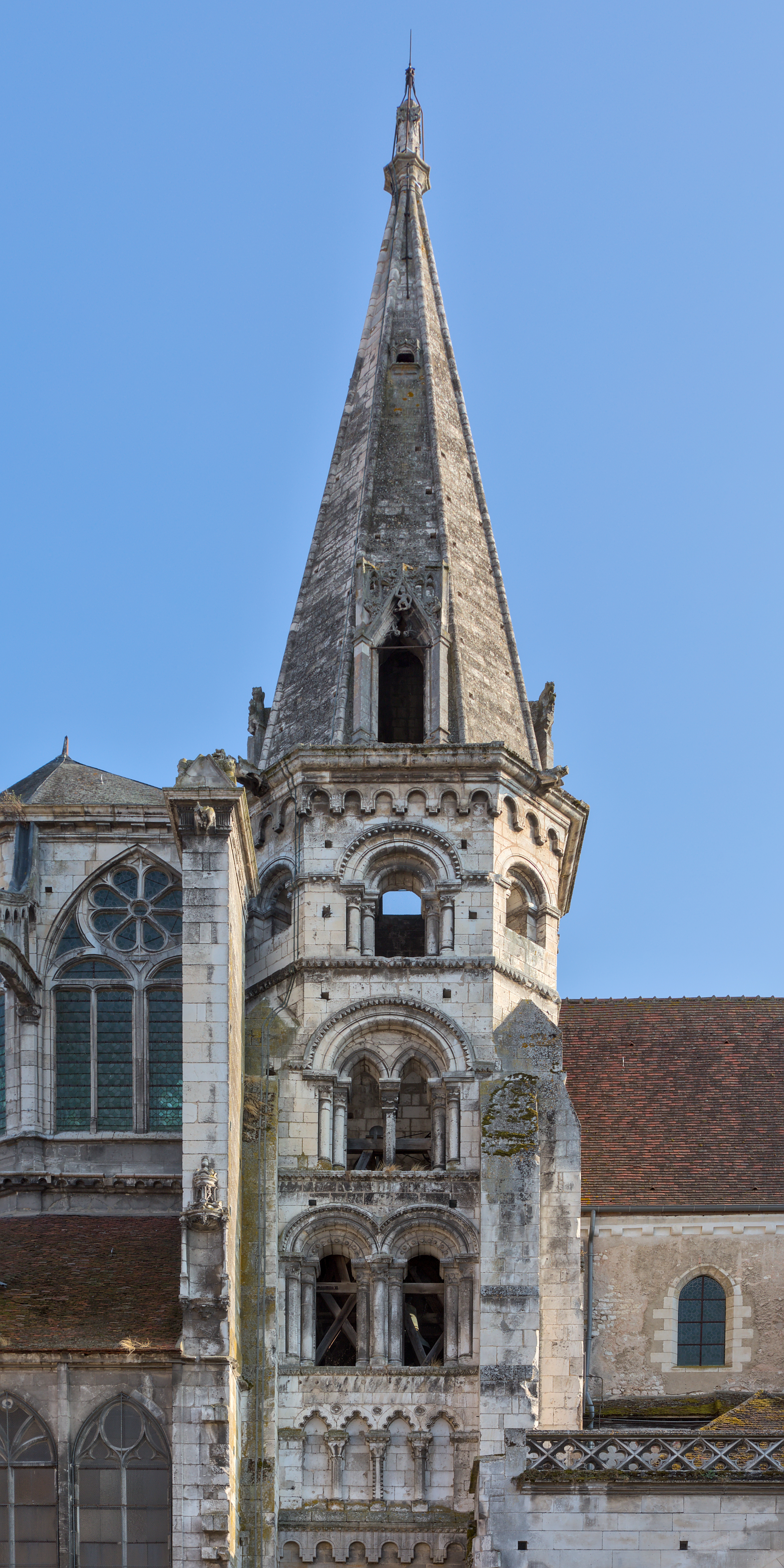
Tower

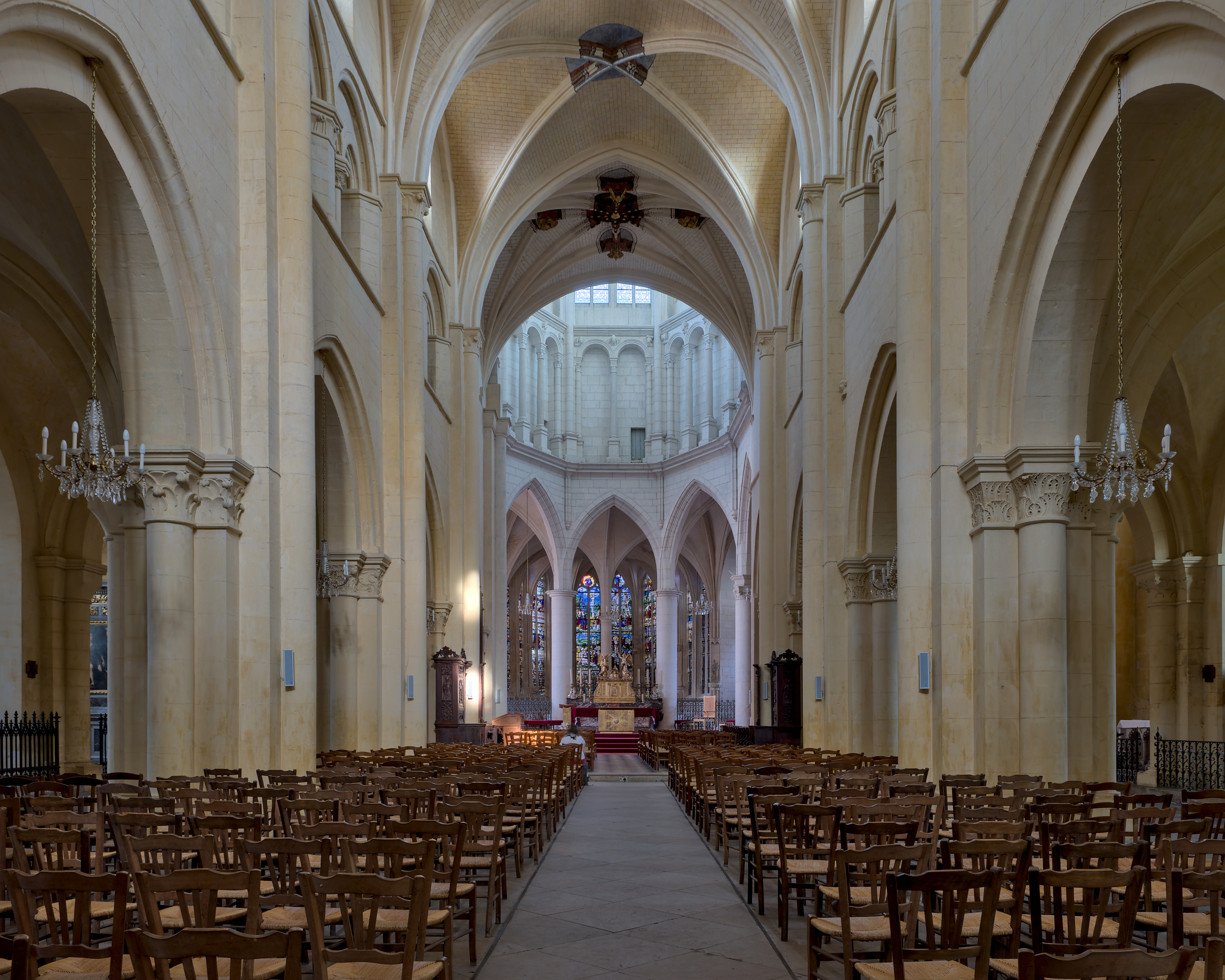
Nave

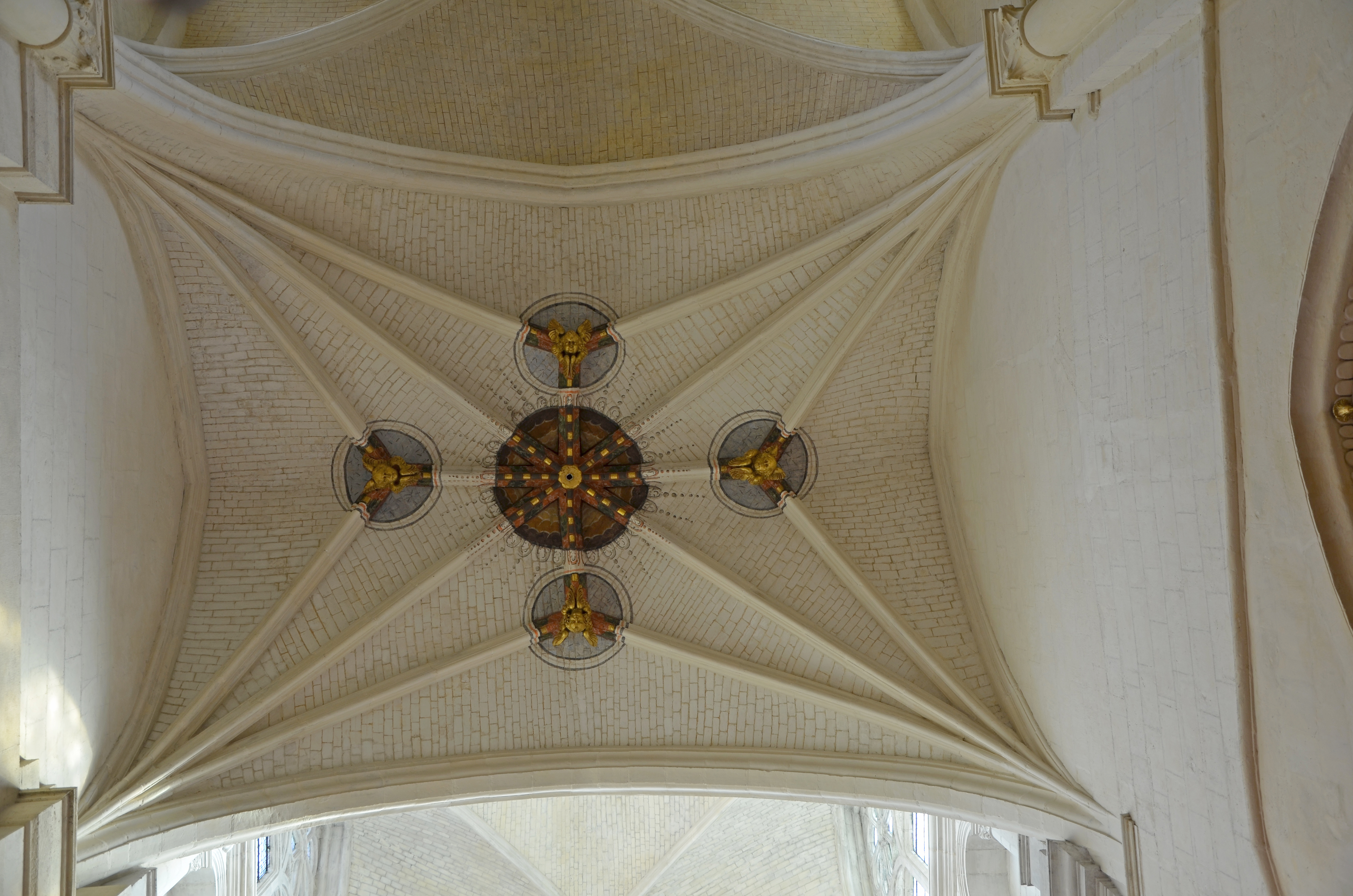
Vault, last bay of the nave before the choir

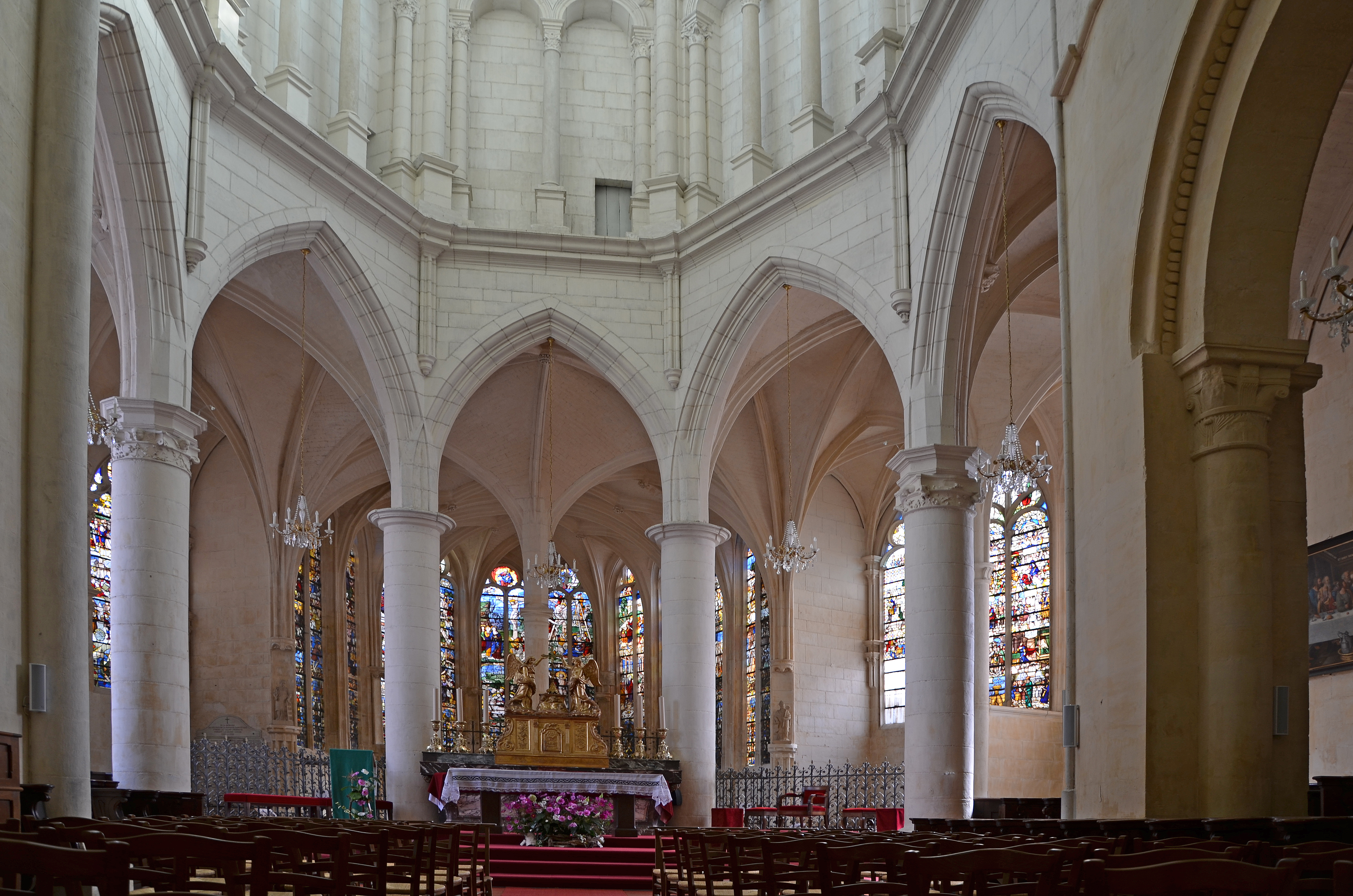
Choir

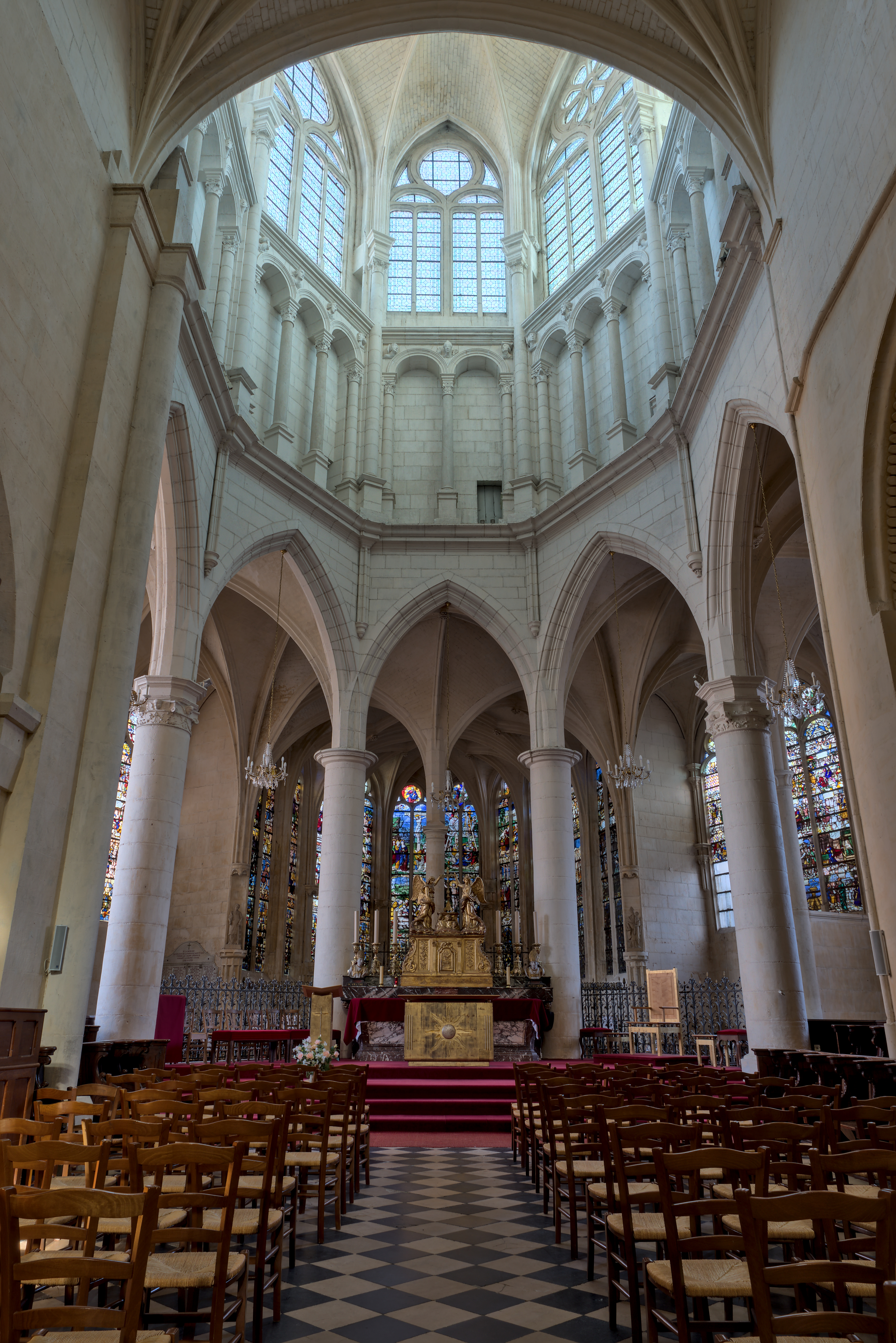
Choir and cupola

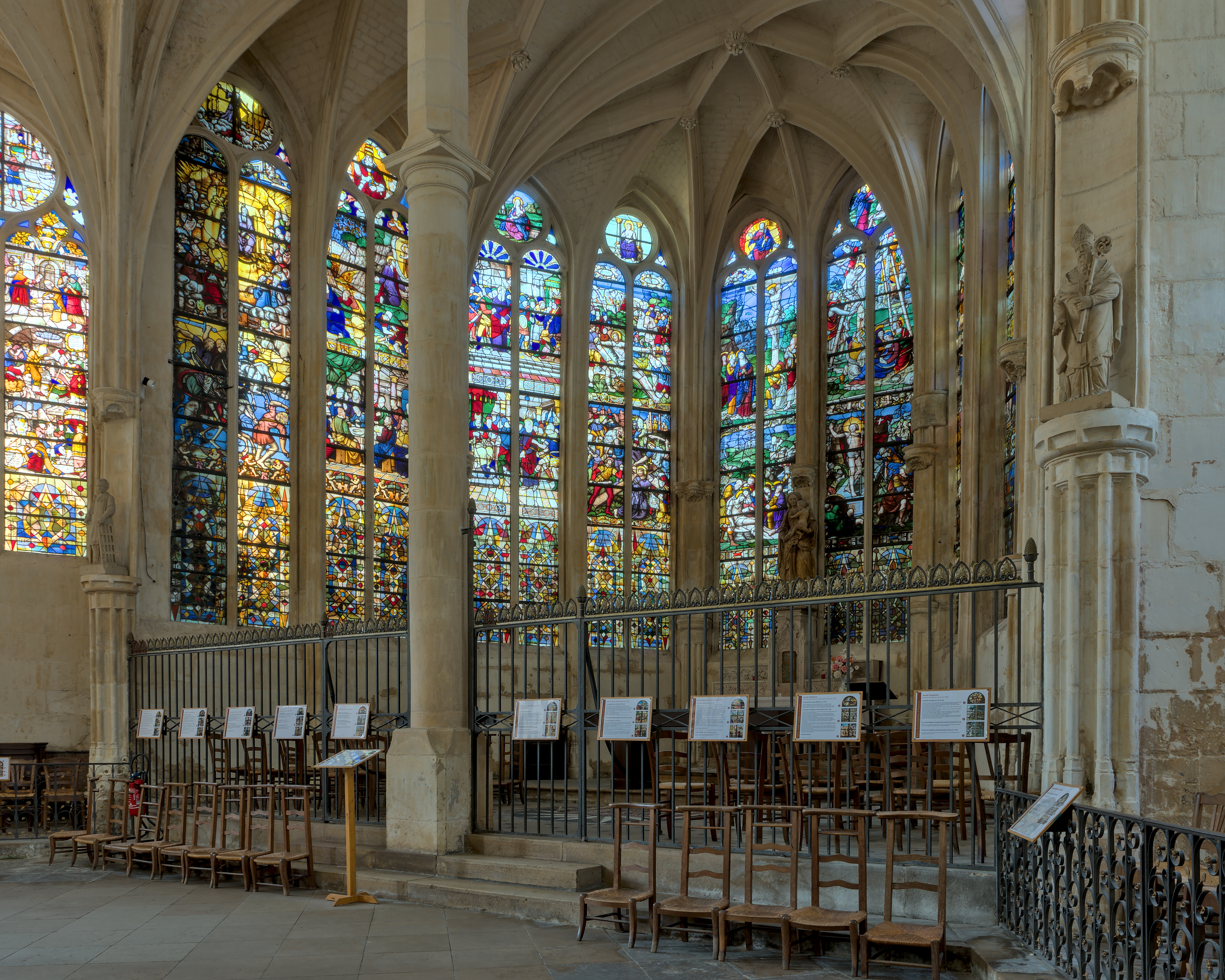
Central chapel, where the most interesting stained-glass windows lay

The stained-glass windows of Saint-Eusèbe

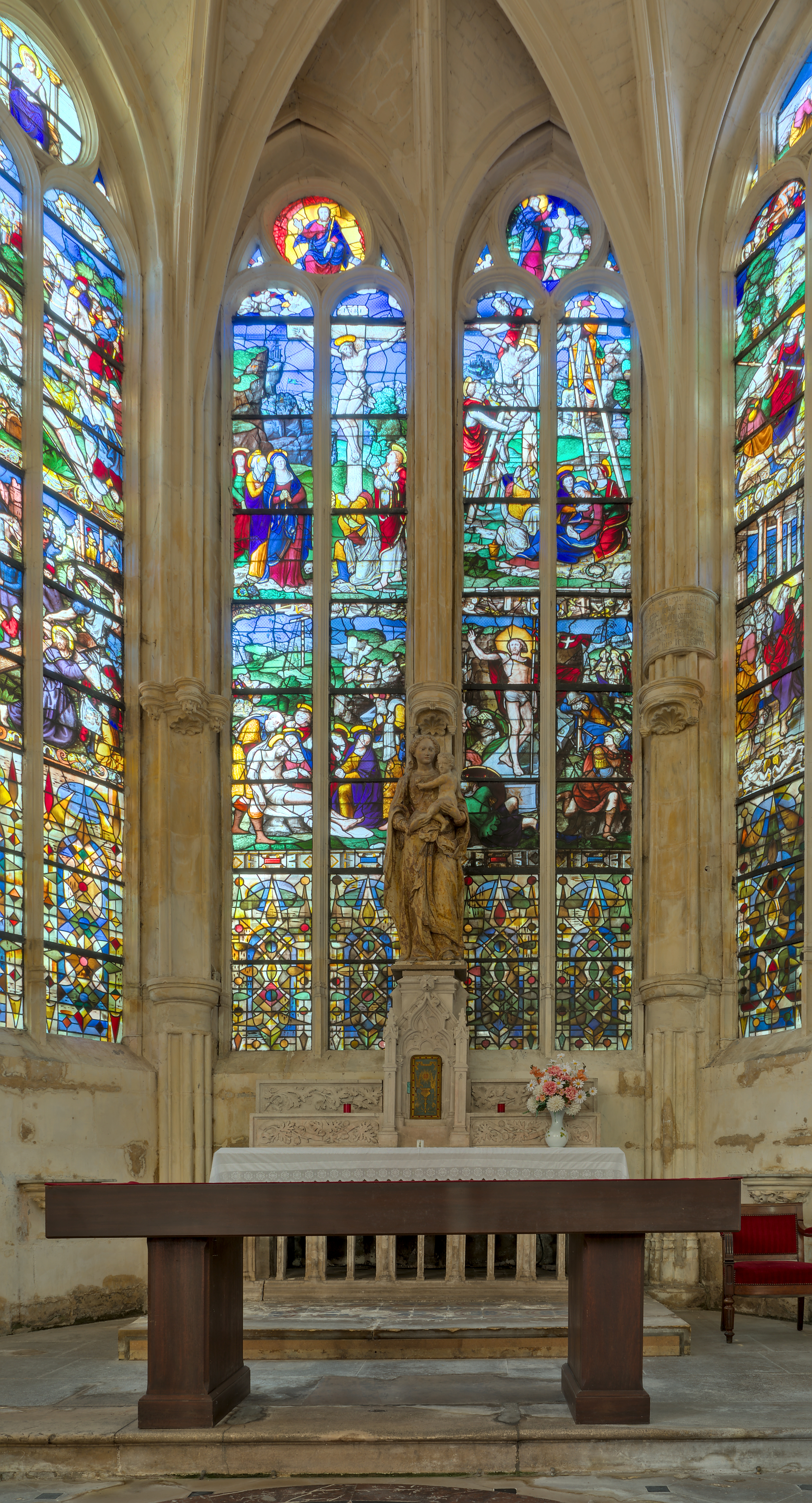

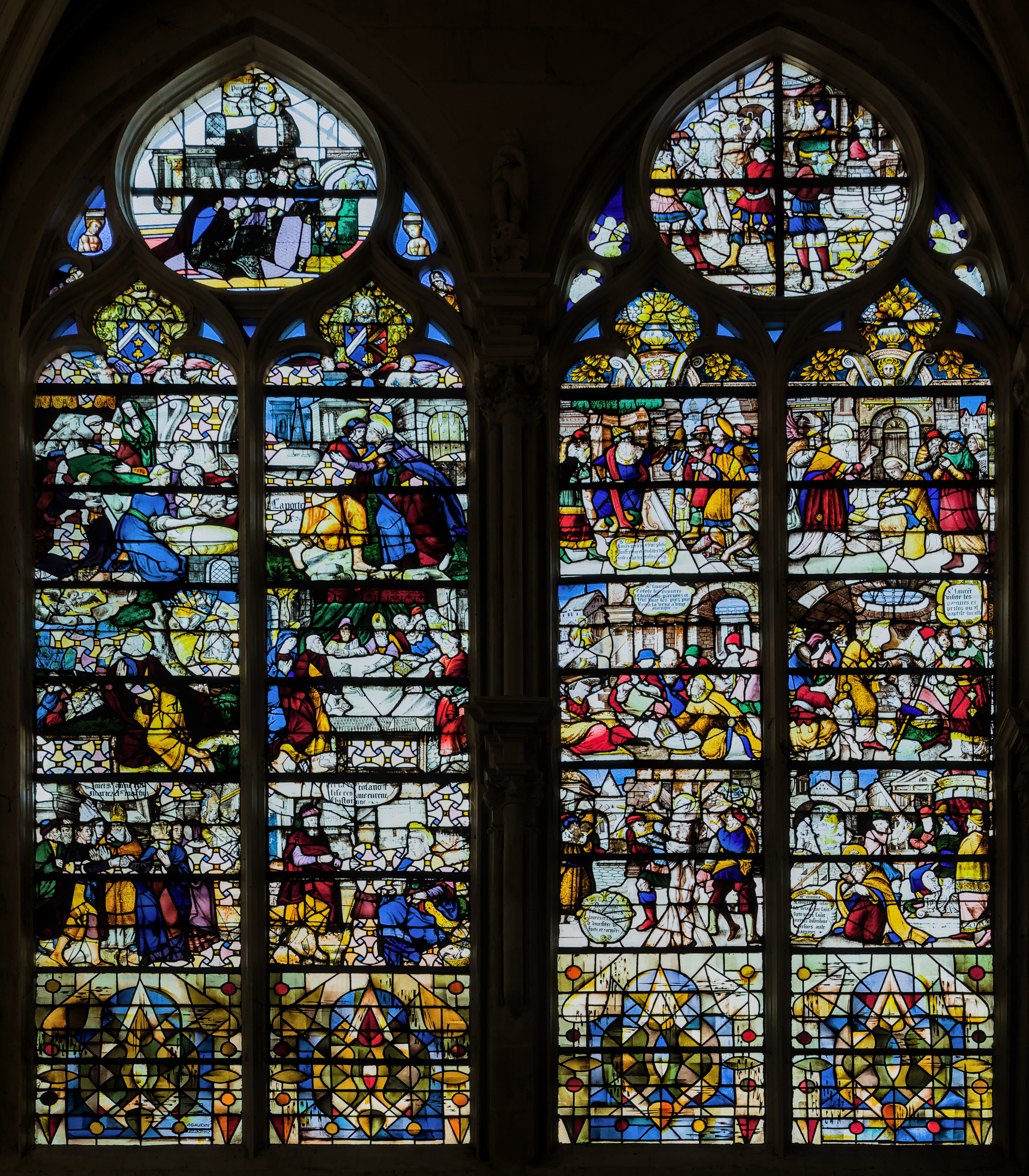

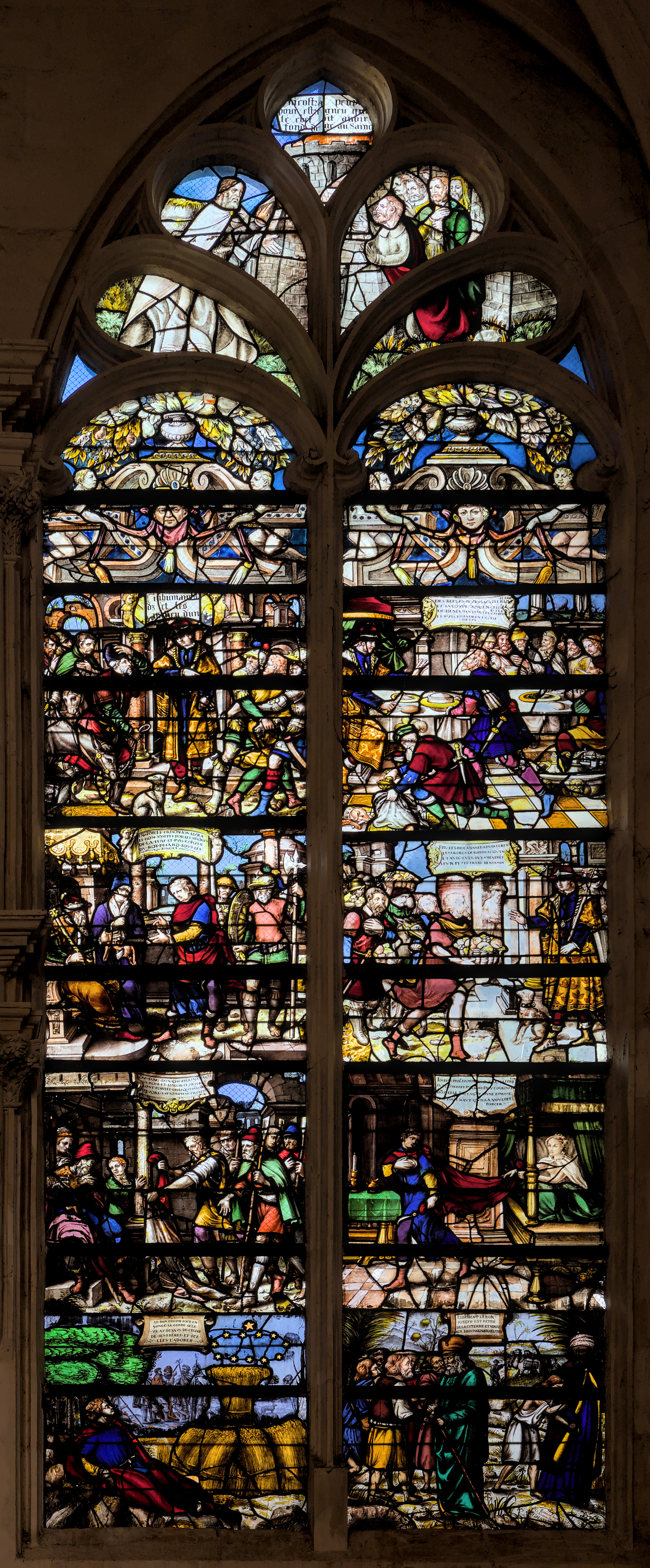

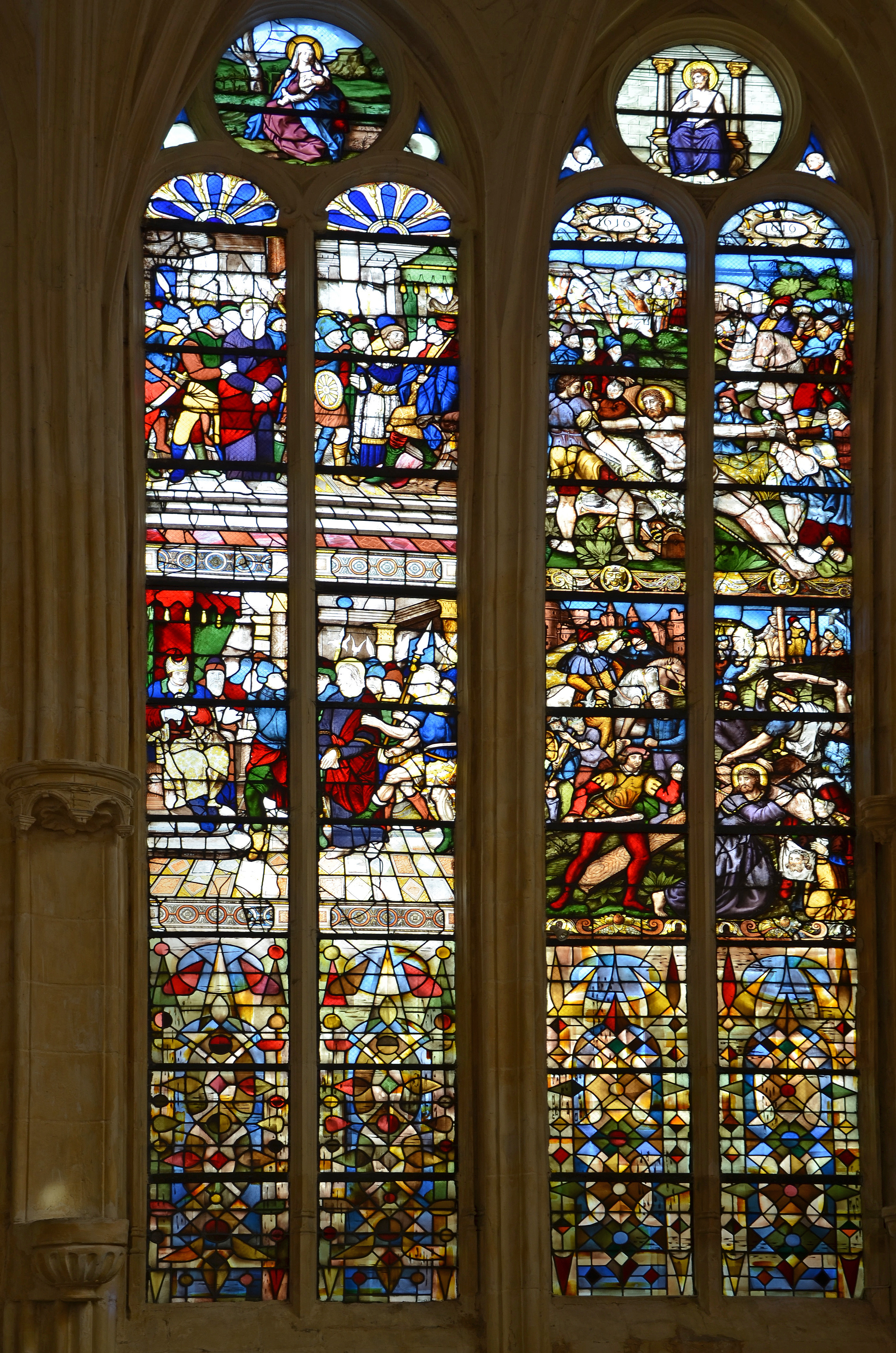

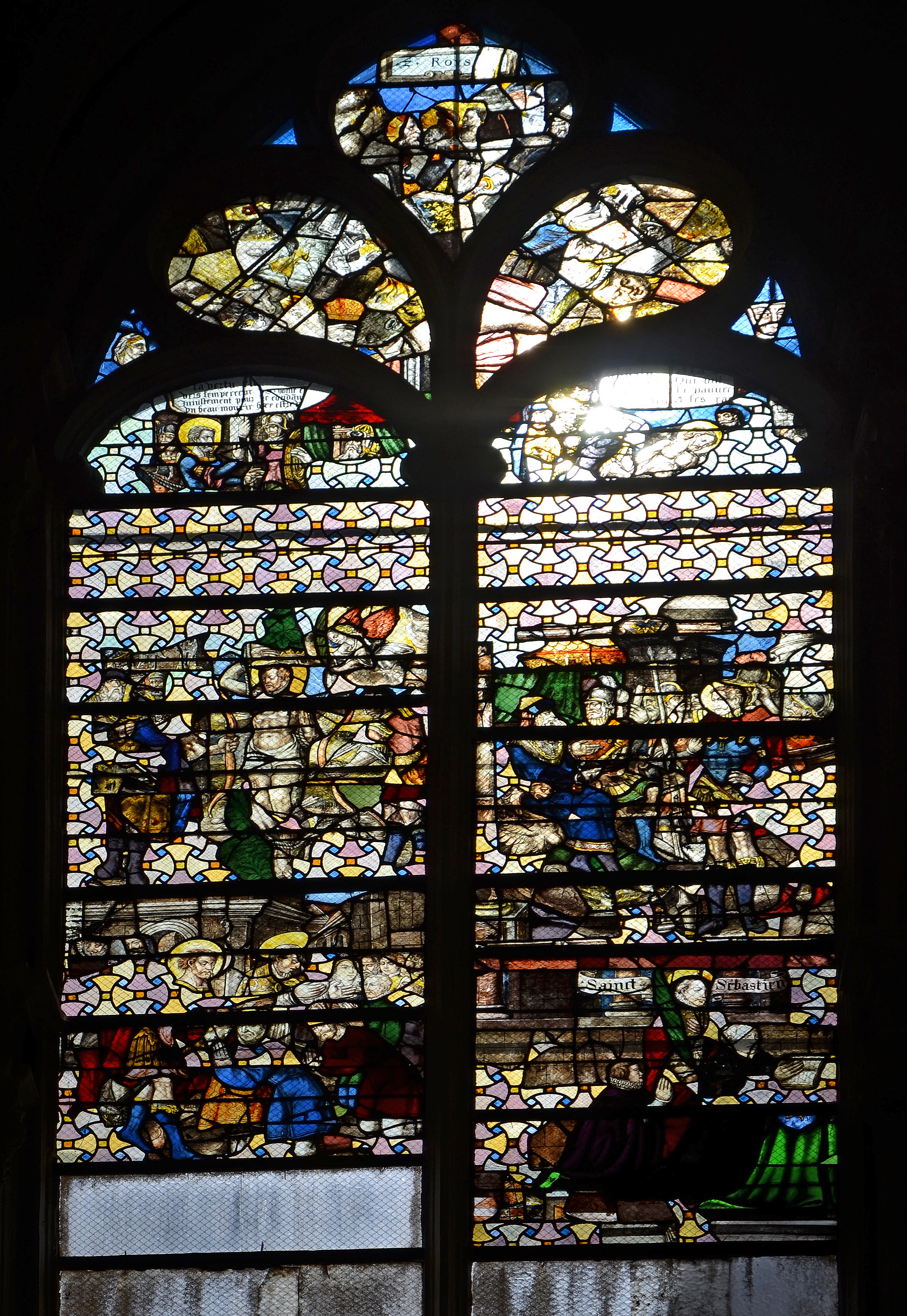

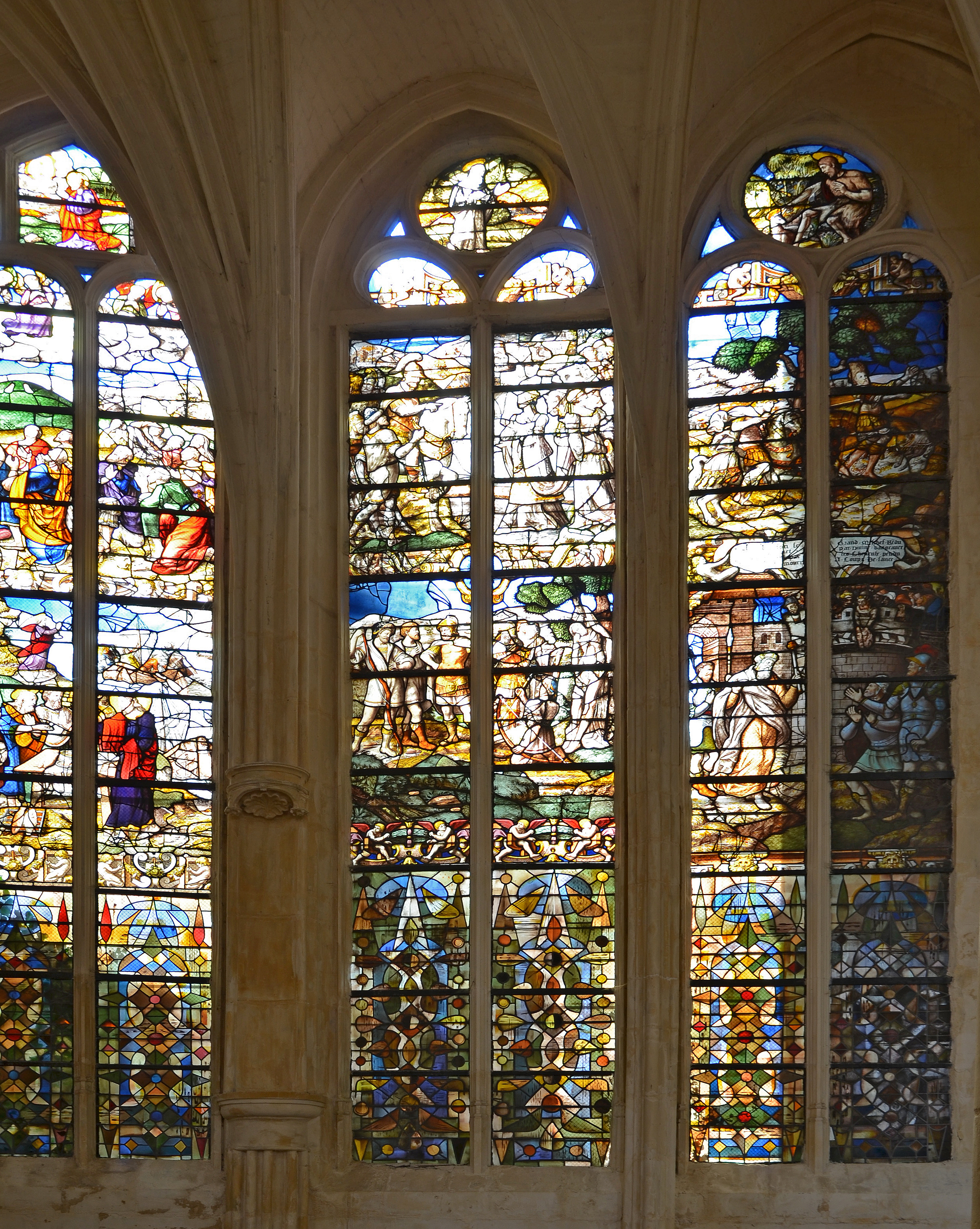

== Bibliography ==
- Lebeuf, Jean (1743). Mémoires concernant l'histoire ecclésiastique et civile d'Auxerre... (in French). Vol. 1. Auxerre: Perriquet.
- Lebeuf, Jean; Challe, Ambroise; Quantin, Maximilien (1851). Mémoires concernant l'histoire ecclésiastique et civile d'Auxerre : continués jusqu'à nos jours avec addition de nouvelles preuves et annotations (in French). Vol. 2. Auxerre: Perriquet.
- Lescuyer, A. (1839). "Notice sur l'église Saint-Eusèbe d'Auxerre". Annuaire Historique du département de l'Yonne (in French). Auxerre. pp. 318–326. lescuyer1839.
- Velde, Danielle; Perrot, Françoise (2016). "La verrière de sainte Anne à Saint-Eusèbe d'Auxerre : les donateurs et leurs armoiries révélés". Bulletin du Centre d'études médiévales (in French) (20–2). Auxerre. doi:10.4000/cem.14552.
