= Jules Nadi =

French politician

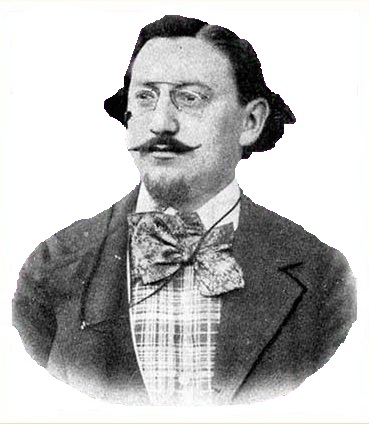
- Jules Nadi

Member of the French Parliament for Canton du Grand-Serre
- In office 1910–1919

Member of the French Parliament for Romans-sur-Isère
- In office 1919–1925

Jules Camille Victor Pomaret, known as Jules Nadi (Nadi, the anagram of his wife, Dina) (born in Valence on 19 May 1872 – died in Paris on 7 November 1928) was a French politician who represented Drôme in southeastern France. A socialist since 1898, at different times, he was a member of the French Workers' Party (POF) (1898–1900), French Section of the Workers' International (SFIO) (1914–1921; 1923–1928) and the French Communist Party (PCF) (1921–1923).

== Biography ==
Nadi was born in Valence, Drôme. His father, who built roads and bridges, died when Nadi was seven. After graduating from primary school and upper primary school in Valence, Nadi became an employee of the town hall.

He started administrative assistant work when he was sixteen and then, after his military service, he entered politics at age 26, joining the POF of Jules Guesde. With François Lattard, Nadi founded the literary journal, L'Œuvre, in July 1897 in Valence; he headed the journal, which was associated with the Symbolist movement. He left the POF as early as 1900, feeling no attraction to Marxism and socialism. He preferred creating autonomous socialist groups; and was an advocate of freethought, freemasonry, and the International League for Human Rights. In 1901, Nadi was appointed mayor of Romans-sur-Isère, a town near Valence;and in 1905, he founded the Lodge of Saint-Vallier. A propagandist, he helped organized the Fédération Socialiste autonome Ardèche-Drôme, and was unanimously elected secretary of the Federation.

Nadi attended the SFIO's 1905 Globe Congress and became secretary of the local federation. Accused of political guilt, in 1907, the new mayor of Romans-sur-Isère, Dr. Ernest Gailly, dismissed Nadi, through the influence of Joseph Caillaux. The SFIO's 1907 National Council decided to create two alternate delegates, Nadi and Adéodat Compère-Morel (who was succeeded by René Cabannes); the remainder of the delegation included Gaston Levy, Adrien Pressemane, and Henri Laudier.

Nadi was elected to the General Council in 1910 for Canton du Grand-Serre, Drôme, and the Chamber of Deputies in 1914. During this time, activists from La Roche-sur-Yon and Les Sables-d'Olonne appealed to the SFIO, which sent Nadi, a Permanent Delegate, to visit them, resulting in the emergence of additional SFIO groups. Chaired by Nadi, the first Congress was held in La Roche-sur-Yon, from which emerged the Socialist Federation of Vendee, with a hundred members. In 1919, Jules Nadi was re-elected to the General Council representing Romans-sur-Isère, where he remained until his death in 1925, defeating Gailly.

In 1919, Nadi was also elected mayor of Romans-sur-Isère. In this role, he established a municipal socialism, with specific attention to the construction of housing for workers, redeveloping former barracks that were old religious buildings. He built the garden city that now bears his name, which was inaugurated on 28 October 1928 by Minister Louis Loucheur. For social protection, in 1921, he created a free placement office and a security fund for workers. He established a center of free antenatal care, a tuberculosis clinic, a counseling center against sexually transmitted diseases, and the public bathhouse. He built the sports park and restored the buildings of the town hall. True to the ideology of Freethought, his municipal socialism provided grants to secular works and municipal organizations.

At SFIO's 1920 Tours Congress, he decided to join the PCF, but was expelled two years later, along with E. Soutif, as Nadi was repelled by Bolshevism and its requirement to denounce Freemasonry. Nadi rejoined the SFIO with strong anti-communist sentiments. He was again re-elected in 1924 on a common list-SFIO and the French Radical Party in 1928, by majority vote. In 1925, Nadi "introduced a bill for creating a State monopoly of insurance into the Chamber of Deputies, but with little chance of success".

His personal influence allowed the SFIO to offset the influence of the Confédération générale du travail unitaire. At his death, the local newspaper Le Jacquemart, local proponent of the right wing, one he had opposed from his early years, paid tribute to Nadi.

== Partial works ==
- Jules Pomaret. L'Ultime soupir! (1892)
- L'affranchi (1902)
- Étude sur le syndicalisme envisagé comme moyen de remplacer la forme actuelle du salariat: présentée/à la loge le Val libre...; par Jules Nadi. (1915)
