= Hôtel de Ville, Auxerre =

Town hall in Auxerre, France

Hôtel de Ville
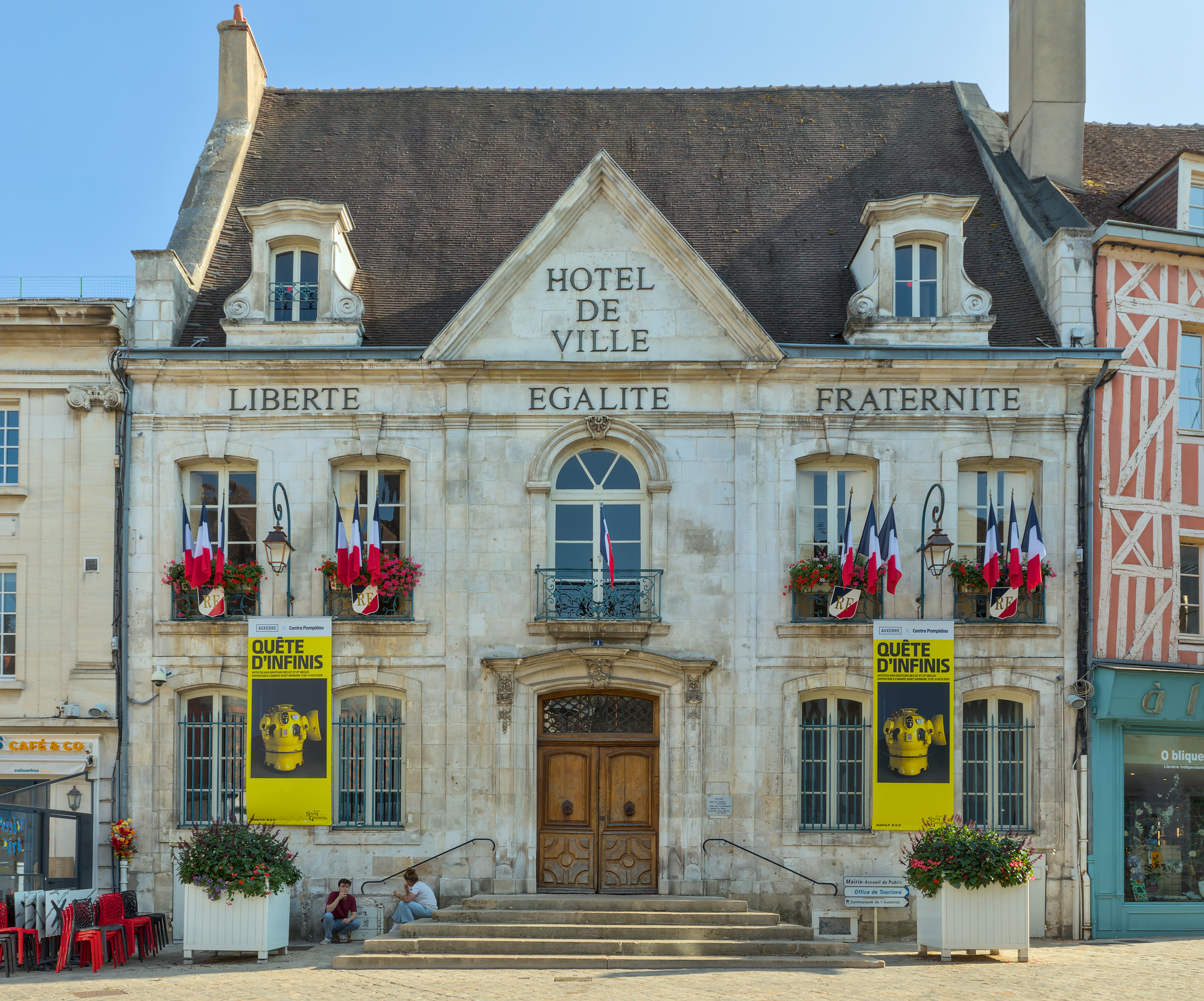
- The main frontage of the Hôtel de Ville in August 2025
- Interactive map of the Hôtel de Ville area

General information
- Type: City hall
- Architectural style: Neoclassical style
- Location: Auxerre, France
- Coordinates: 47.7960°N 3.5705°E
- Completed: 1735

The Hôtel de Ville (French pronunciation: [otɛl də vil], City Hall) is a municipal building in Auxerre, Yonne, in central France, standing on Place de l'Hôtel de Ville.

== History ==
In the Middle Ages, the aldermen met either in a public house or, at the invitation of the monks, in the Couvent des Cordeliers (Convent of the Cordeliers). After finding this arrangement unsatisfactory, the local seigneur, John of Burgundy, granted funds for a dedicated town hall. The site they selected was on the south side of the town square, just to the north of the old Palais Comtal (county palace). The original building was designed in the medieval style and was completed in 1452.

In the 15th century, the highlight of the year was the annual play performed for the benefit of the inhabitants in the town hall. The plays were usually of a religious nature and, in the first year, the aldermen arranged a play about the life of Saint Germain and the Passion of Jesus, which was performed at pentecost. In March 1634, King Louis XIII visited the town while in pursuit of his rebellious brother, Gaston, Duke of Orléans. The king was greeted by an orchestra, a choir and a fountain of wine, all assembled in front of the town hall to celebrate his arrival.

After the original building became dilapidated, it was remodelled in the mid-1730s. The foundation stone for the new structure was laid by the mayor, Edme-Jean Baudesson, on 22 June 1733. It was rebuilt in the neoclassical style in ashlar stone and the work was completed around 1735. The design involved a symmetrical main frontage of five bays facing onto the town square. The central bay featured a short flight of steps leading up to a segmental headed doorway with a moulded surround flanked by pilasters supporting a cornice. There was a round headed window with a moulded surround and a keystone on the first floor. The other bays were fenestrated by segmental headed windows with keystones. At roof level, there was an entablature, a pediment above the central bay, and a dormer window on either side. The pediment originally contained the coat of arms of the Matilda I, Countess of Nevers in the tympanum. (Note: Matilda was Countess of Nevers when the town was given its first charter in the 13th century.)

Internally, the principal room was the Grand Salle (Great Hall) which was used, under the ancien régime, for general assemblies of residents and, later, for meetings of the town council. In 1792, during the French Revolution, two members of the public were murdered by revolutionaries in front of the town hall. A large u-shaped table, featuring the coat of arms of the town, was carved by François Brochet and installed in the Great Hall in 1962.
