= Louis Amable Crapelet =

French water-colour painter

Louis Amable Crapelet (1822-1867) was a French water-colour painter. He was born at Auxerre in 1822, studied under Corot, Durand-Brager, and Séchan. He went to Egypt in 1852, and ascended the Nile as far as the third cataract, returning to France in 1854. Many of his drawings were the result of this expedition. He died at Marseilles in 1867.
