= Hôtel de Ville, Romans-sur-Isère =

Town hall in Romans-sur-Isère, France

Hôtel de Ville
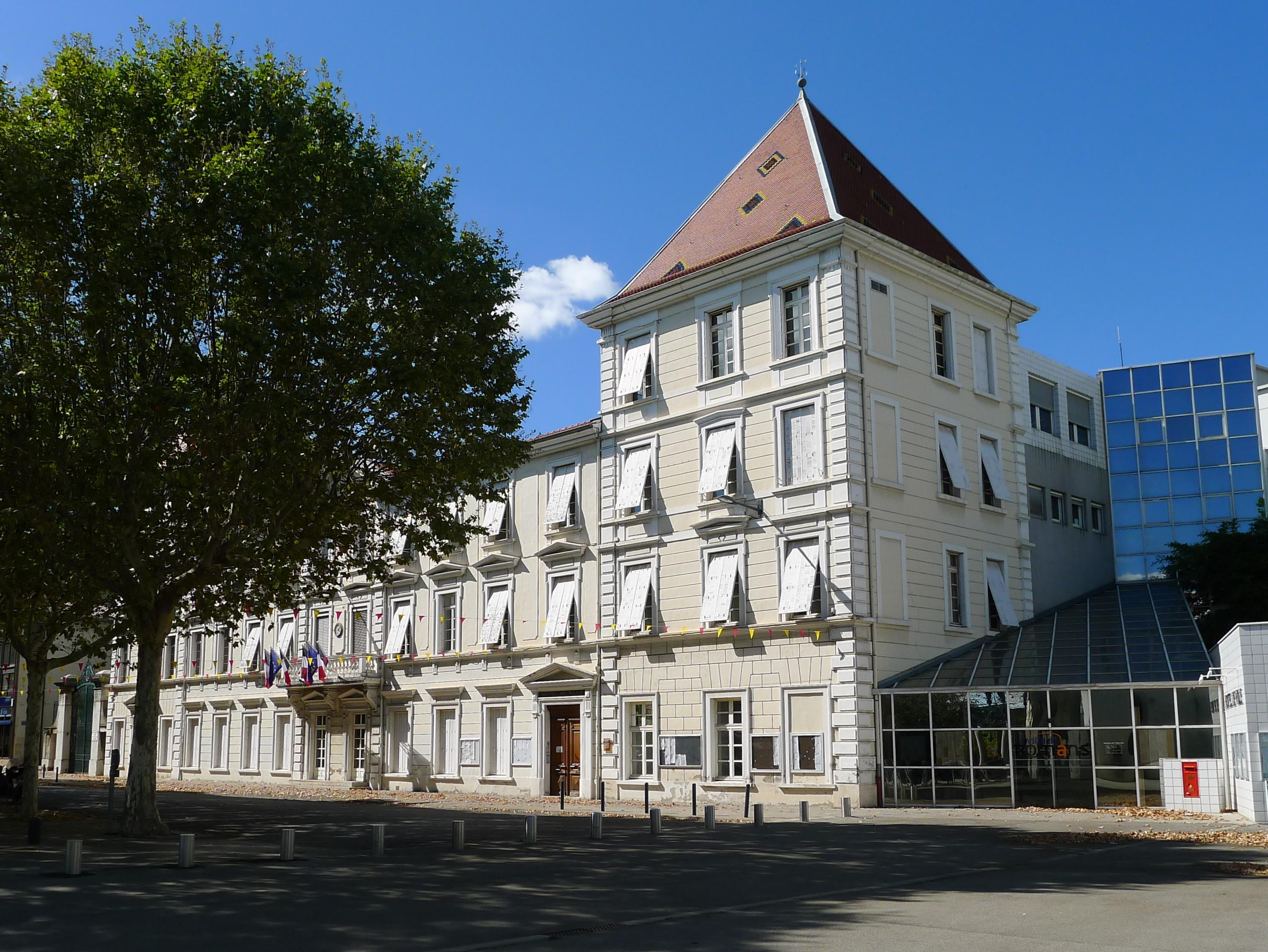
- The main frontage of the Hôtel de Ville in August 2012
- Interactive map of the Hôtel de Ville area

General information
- Type: City hall
- Architectural style: Neoclassical style
- Location: Romans-sur-Isère, France
- Coordinates: 45.0446°N 5.0525°E
- Completed: 1802

The Hôtel de Ville (French pronunciation: [otɛl də vil], City Hall) is a municipal building in Romans-sur-Isère, Drôme, in southeastern France, standing on Place Jules Nadi.

== History ==
Under the ancien régime, the consuls originally rented a room for their meetings. This arrangement continued until July 1374, when a former consul, Perrot de Verdun, bequeathed his house on the south side of Rue de l'Armillerie to the town for the purposes of establishing a municipal office, to be known as the Maison Commune. The pediment above the door was inscribed "Romans se gouverne par ses bonnes manières et ses hons citoyens" ("Romans governs itself by its good manners and its honorable citizens"). The building was restored in 1499, in 1562, in 1567 and in 1756. After it was no longer required for municipal use, it was sold to a private purchaser. It then served successively as a performance hall, as a private residence and then as a military barracks, before being demolished to allow the expansion of an adjacent street in 1895.

Following the French Revolution, the new town council decided to acquire a more substantial building for municipal use. The building they selected, on the north side of what is now Place Jules Nadi, was the Couvent des Cordeliers (Convent of the Cordeliers). The convent was established by Aymar VI de Poitiers in June 1252 and was subsequently managed by the Franciscans. It was sacked by the Huguenots in 1562 and then burned down by them in 1567 during the French Wars of Religion. After the convent was confiscated by the state as biens nationaux (for the good of the state), the monks were driven out and it was acquired by the council in 1790.

Although the council initially agreed to meet in part of the former convent, the building was too dilapidated for long term use and, in the late 18th century, the council decided to demolish it and to erect a new building on the same site. The new building was designed in the neoclassical style, built in ashlar stone and was completed in 1802. It was modified in the mid-19th century.

The design involved a symmetrical main frontage of 16 bays facing onto what is now Place Jules Nadi. It was laid out with a central section of two bays, two wings of four bays each and, beyond that, two pavilions of three bays each. The central section and the wings were three storeys high, while the pavilions were four storeys high. The central section featured two doorways with triangular pediments on the ground floor, two French doors and a balustraded balcony on the first floor, and two casement windows on the second floor. The central bay was flanked by banded pilasters supporting an open pediment with a coat of arms in the tympanum. The other bays were fenestrated by casement windows with moulded surrounds. The pavilions were flanked by banded pilasters supporting cornices and pyramid-shaped roofs. Internally, the principal room was the Salle du Conseil (council chamber).

On 22 August 1944, during the Second World War, troops of the 12th Cuirassier Regiment together with elements of the Francs-Tireurs et Partisans entered the town and seized the town hall. The council chamber was refurnished with fine woodwork recovered from a former clothing store owned by Parfait Lanaz on Place Jacquemart (now Place Charles de Gaulle) in March 1954. The woodwork was restored by Vallon Faure and the seating reupholstered by Global Concept in 2021.
