= Auxerre =

Prefecture and commune in Bourgogne-Franche-Comté, France

Auxerre Auchoirre (Burgundian)
- Prefecture and commune
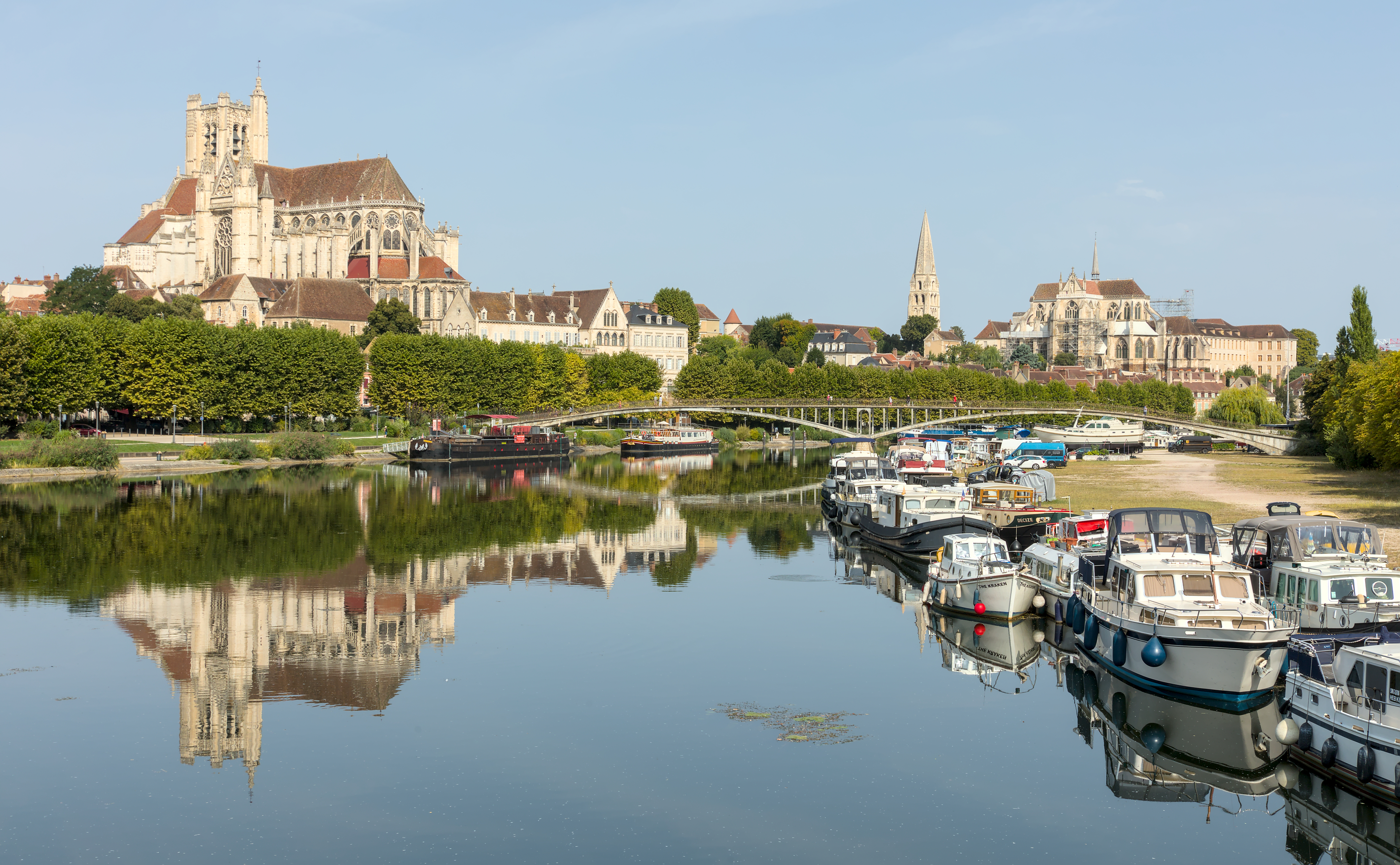
- Auxerre, Yonne, Cathedral and Abbey viewed from Paul Bert bridge

- Coat of arms
- Location of Auxerre
- Location within France Location within Bourgogne-Franche-Comté
- Coordinates: 47°47′55″N 3°34′02″E
- Country: France
- Region: Bourgogne-Franche-Comté
- Department: Yonne
- Arrondissement: Auxerre
- Canton: Auxerre-1, Auxerre-2, Auxerre-3, Auxerre-4
- Intercommunality: CA Auxerrois

Government
  - Mayor (2020–2026): Crescent Marault (LR)
- Area^{1}: 49.95 km^{2} (19.29 sq mi)
- Elevation: 102 m (335 ft)
- Highest elevation: 217 m (712 ft)
- Lowest elevation: 93 m (305 ft)
- Population (2023): 35,097
  - Density: 702.6/km^{2} (1,820/sq mi)
- Time zone: UTC+01:00 (CET)
  - Summer (DST): UTC+02:00 (CEST)
- INSEE/Postal code: 89024 /89000
- ^{1} French Land Register data, which excludes lakes, ponds, glaciers > 1 km^{2} (0.386 sq mi or 247 acres) and river estuaries.

Auxerre (/oʊˈsɛər/ oh-SAIR, French: [osɛʁ], Burgundian: Auchoirre) is the capital (prefecture) of the Yonne department and the fourth-largest city in the Burgundy historical region southeast of Paris. Auxerre's population today is about 35,000; the urban area (aire d'attraction) comprises roughly 111,000 inhabitants. Residents of Auxerre are referred to as Auxerrois.

Auxerre is a commercial and industrial centre, with industries including food production, woodworking and batteries. Nearby areas are also noted for the production of Burgundy wine, including Chablis. In 1995 Auxerre was named a "Town of Art and History".

== Geography ==
Auxerre lies on the river Yonne and the Canal du Nivernais, about 150 km southeast of Paris and 120 km northwest of Dijon. The A6 autoroute (Paris–Lyon) passes northeast of the city. Auxerre-Saint-Gervais station has rail connections to Dijon, Paris, Corbigny and Avallon.

== History ==
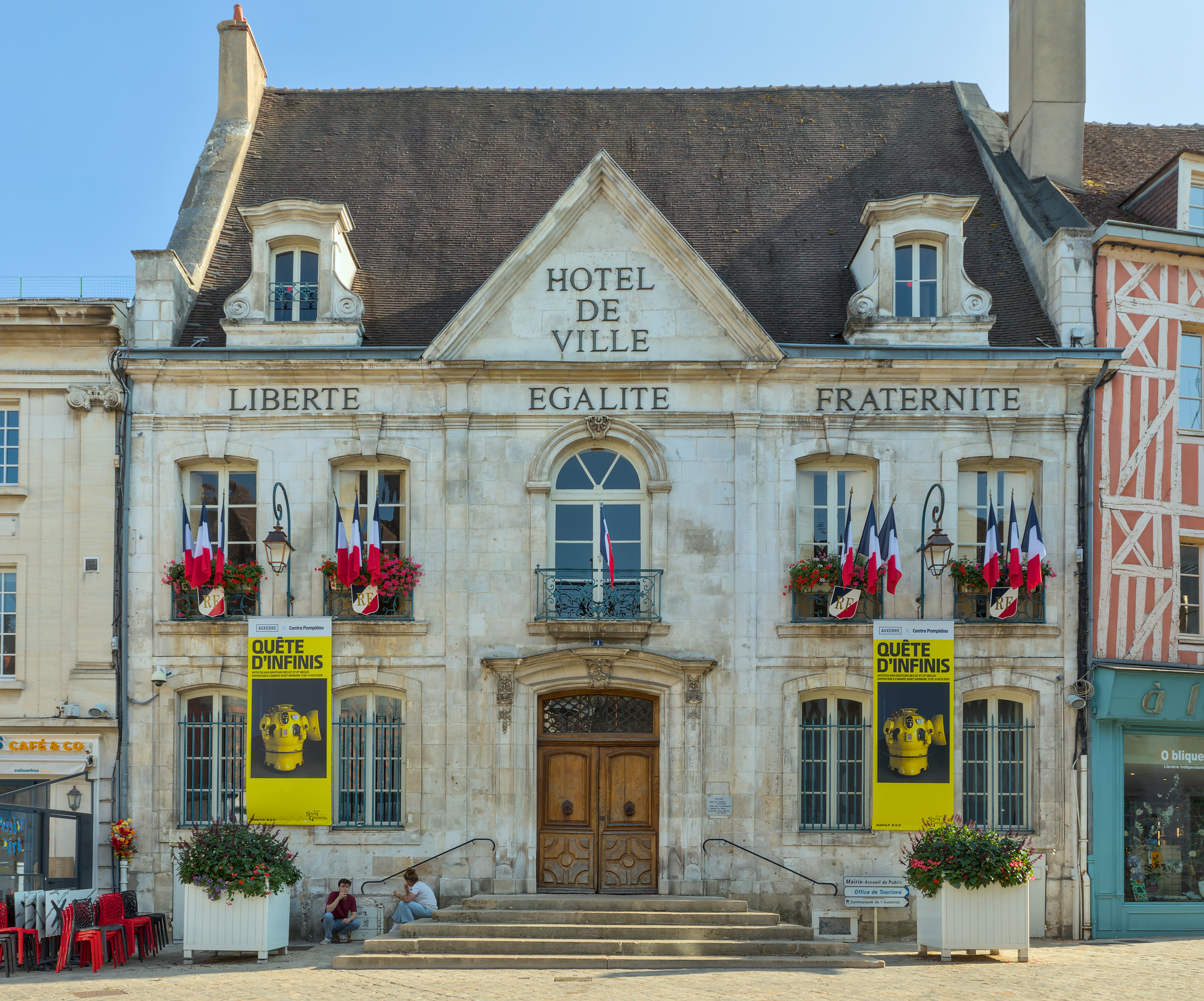
The Hôtel de Ville

Auxerre was a flourishing Gallo-Roman centre, then called Autissiodorum, through which passed one of the main roads of the area, the Via Agrippa (1st century AD) which crossed the Yonne (Gallo-Roman Icauna) here. In the third century it became the seat of a bishop and a provincial capital of the Roman Empire. In the 5th century it received a cathedral. In the late 11th-early 12th century the existing communities were included inside a new line of walls built by the feudal counts of Auxerre.

Bourgeois activities accompanied the traditional land and wine cultivations starting from the twelfth century, and Auxerre developed into a commune with a Hôtel de Ville (town hall) which was completed, in its original form, in 1452.

The Burgundian city, which became part of France under King Louis XI, suffered during the Hundred Years' War and the Wars of Religion. In 1567 it was captured by the Huguenots, and many of the Catholic edifices were damaged. The medieval ramparts were demolished in the 18th century.

In the 19th century numerous heavy infrastructures were built, including a railway station, a psychiatric hospital and the courts, and new quarters were developed on the right bank of the Yonne.

== Archaeology ==
In June 2024, the French National Institute for Preventive Archaeological Research announced the discovery of a large Roman cemetery in Place du Maréchal Leclerc, Auxerre, France. The cemetery contains more than 250 burials of infants and stillborn babies. Some remains were buried in ceramic vessels and wooden coffins, while others were wrapped in textiles.

In June 2025, a vast Roman villa complex spanning over 4,000 square meters was discovered during excavations by the French National Institute for Preventive Archaeological Research (Inrap). Known as Sainte-Nitasse, the site, first identified in the late 19th century, is now recognized as one of the largest Roman villas in Gaul. Dating from the 1st to 3rd centuries CE, the complex features a central garden, perimeter wall, and various rooms including substantial private baths.

== Demographics ==
Historical population

| Year | Pop. | ±% p.a. |
|---|---|---|
| 1793 | 12,000 | — |
| 1800 | 12,047 | +0.06% |
| 1806 | 12,044 | −0.00% |
| 1821 | 12,065 | +0.01% |
| 1831 | 11,439 | −0.53% |
| 1836 | 12,326 | +1.50% |
| 1841 | 12,326 | +0.00% |
| 1846 | 13,968 | +2.53% |
| 1851 | 14,166 | +0.28% |
| 1856 | 15,119 | +1.31% |
| 1861 | 15,081 | −0.05% |
| 1866 | 15,497 | +0.55% |
| 1872 | 15,631 | +0.14% |
| 1876 | 16,239 | +0.96% |
| 1881 | 16,986 | +0.90% |
| 1886 | 17,456 | +0.55% |
| 1891 | 18,036 | +0.66% |
| 1896 | 18,576 | +0.59% |
| 1901 | 18,901 | +0.35% |

| Year | Pop. | ±% p.a. |
|---|---|---|
| 1906 | 20,931 | +2.06% |
| 1911 | 21,929 | +0.94% |
| 1921 | 21,203 | −0.34% |
| 1926 | 21,978 | +0.72% |
| 1931 | 22,900 | +0.83% |
| 1936 | 24,282 | +1.18% |
| 1946 | 24,052 | −0.10% |
| 1954 | 26,583 | +1.26% |
| 1962 | 31,178 | +2.01% |
| 1968 | 35,784 | +2.32% |
| 1975 | 38,342 | +0.99% |
| 1982 | 38,741 | +0.15% |
| 1990 | 38,819 | +0.03% |
| 1999 | 37,790 | −0.30% |
| 2007 | 37,218 | −0.19% |
| 2012 | 35,096 | −1.17% |
| 2017 | 34,634 | −0.26% |
| 2023 | 35,097 | +0.22% |

Source: EHESS and INSEE (1968–2023)

== Climate ==
Climate data for Auxerre (1991–2020 normals, extremes 1951–2013)
| Month | Jan | Feb | Mar | Apr | May | Jun | Jul | Aug | Sep | Oct | Nov | Dec | Year |
|---|---|---|---|---|---|---|---|---|---|---|---|---|---|
| Record high °C (°F) | 16.8 (62.2) | 23.0 (73.4) | 26.6 (79.9) | 29.8 (85.6) | 32.1 (89.8) | 37.7 (99.9) | 39.6 (103.3) | 41.1 (106.0) | 35.3 (95.5) | 31.3 (88.3) | 22.8 (73.0) | 18.4 (65.1) | 41.1 (106.0) |
| Mean daily maximum °C (°F) | 6.7 (44.1) | 8.4 (47.1) | 12.8 (55.0) | 16.4 (61.5) | 20.1 (68.2) | 23.7 (74.7) | 26.4 (79.5) | 26.3 (79.3) | 21.8 (71.2) | 16.7 (62.1) | 10.6 (51.1) | 7.2 (45.0) | 16.5 (61.7) |
| Daily mean °C (°F) | 4.0 (39.2) | 4.9 (40.8) | 8.2 (46.8) | 11.1 (52.0) | 14.8 (58.6) | 18.2 (64.8) | 20.5 (68.9) | 20.4 (68.7) | 16.4 (61.5) | 12.6 (54.7) | 7.6 (45.7) | 4.7 (40.5) | 12.0 (53.6) |
| Mean daily minimum °C (°F) | 1.3 (34.3) | 1.3 (34.3) | 3.5 (38.3) | 5.7 (42.3) | 9.4 (48.9) | 12.7 (54.9) | 14.6 (58.3) | 14.4 (57.9) | 11.0 (51.8) | 8.4 (47.1) | 4.5 (40.1) | 2.1 (35.8) | 7.4 (45.3) |
| Record low °C (°F) | −20.2 (−4.4) | −18.8 (−1.8) | −11.6 (11.1) | −5.2 (22.6) | −1.0 (30.2) | 3.0 (37.4) | 5.8 (42.4) | 4.0 (39.2) | 0.5 (32.9) | −2.9 (26.8) | −8.8 (16.2) | −15.1 (4.8) | −20.2 (−4.4) |
| Average precipitation mm (inches) | 52.1 (2.05) | 47.8 (1.88) | 48.0 (1.89) | 56.9 (2.24) | 65.5 (2.58) | 54.0 (2.13) | 51.3 (2.02) | 60.1 (2.37) | 55.9 (2.20) | 71.4 (2.81) | 62.1 (2.44) | 60.3 (2.37) | 685.3 (26.98) |
| Average precipitation days (≥ 1.0 mm) | 10.8 | 10.1 | 9.7 | 9.7 | 10.3 | 8.9 | 7.7 | 7.9 | 7.9 | 9.9 | 10.9 | 11.7 | 115.6 |
| Mean monthly sunshine hours | 59.4 | 88.1 | 146.4 | 184.1 | 206.5 | 220.9 | 242.7 | 231.2 | 183.1 | 118.8 | 67.5 | 55.4 | 1,803.9 |
Source 1: Meteo Climat normals, 1991−2020
Source 2: Meteociel (extremes)

== Main sights ==
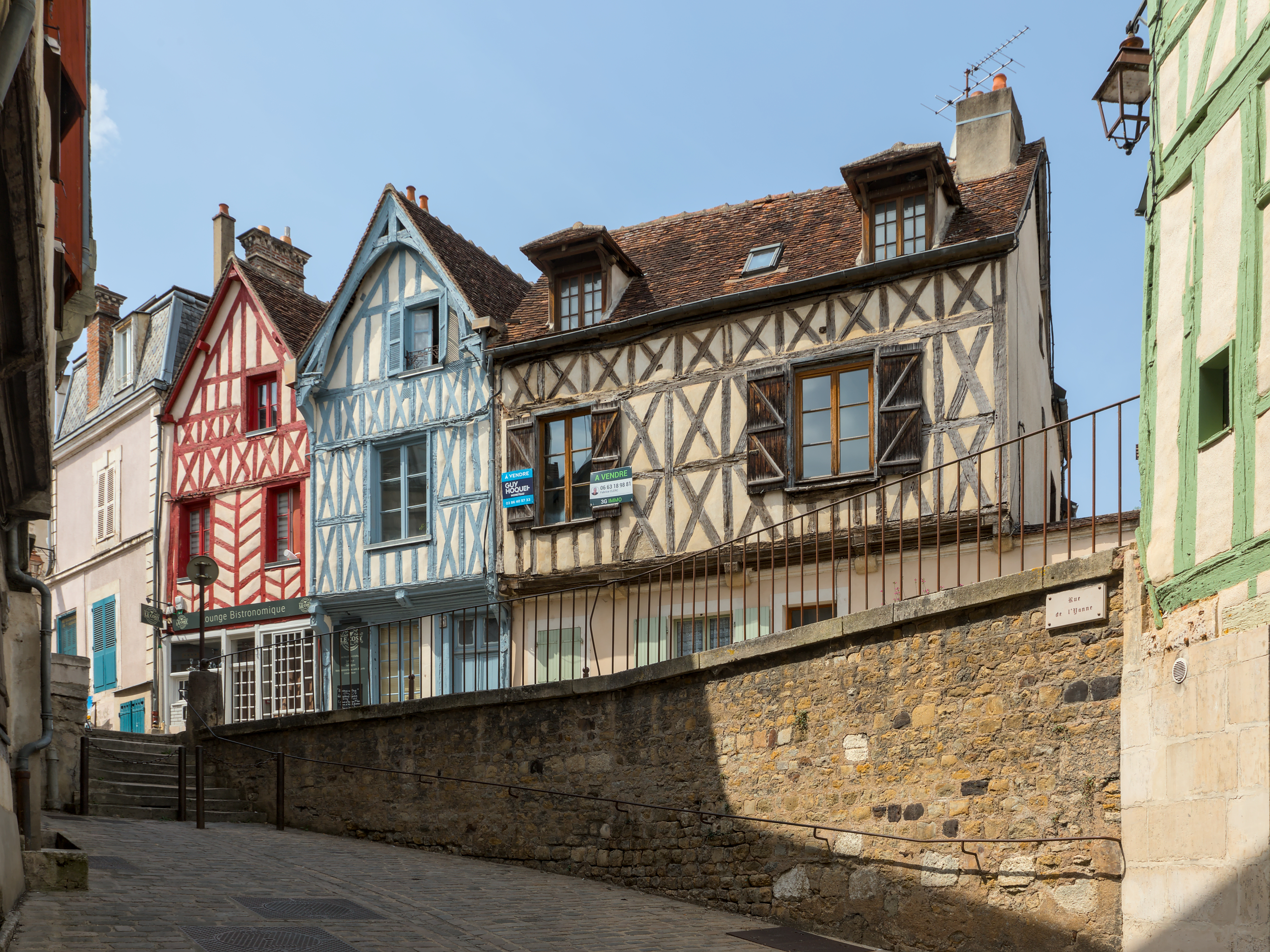
Timber-framed houses in the old town

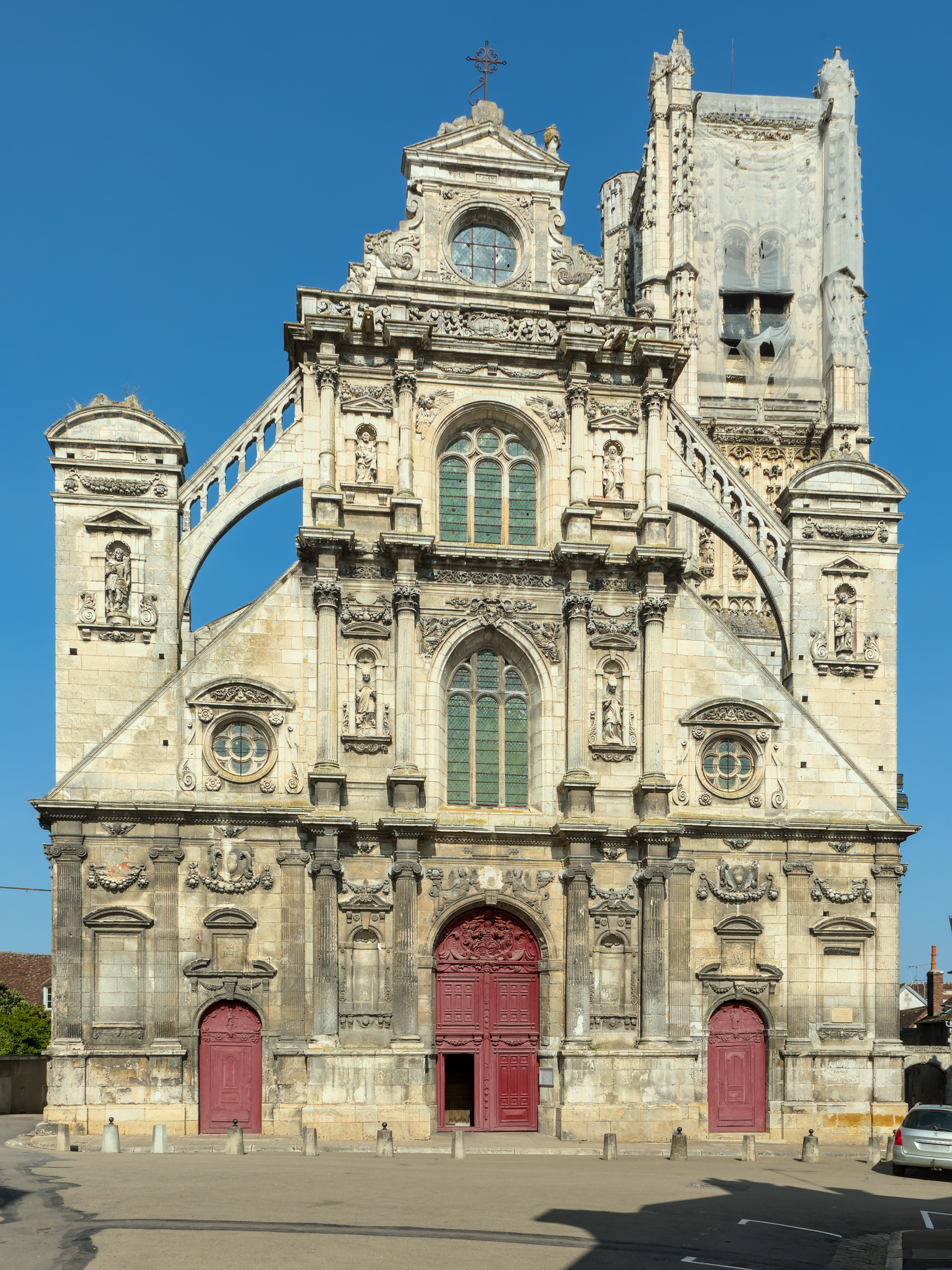
Church of St. Pierre en Vallée, listed as monument

- Cathedral of St. Étienne (11th–16th centuries). In Gothic style, it has three doorways with bas-reliefs. There are stained-glass windows in the choir and the apsidal chapel. The 11th-century crypt houses the remains of the former Romanesque cathedral.
- Abbey of Saint-Germain, existing from the 6th century. The crypt has some of the oldest mural paintings in France, and houses the tomb of the bishops of Auxerre. There is a chapter room (12th century), a cellar (14th century) and a cloister (17th century).
- The Clock Tower, in the Old Town
- The church of St. Pierre en Vallée (17th–18th centuries), established over a 6th-century abbey. In late Gothic style, it has a tower similar to that of the cathedral. Portions of the decorations and inner chapels were financed by local winegrowers.
- Church of St. Eusèbe, founded in the 7th century. The nave was rebuilt in the 13th century, while the tower is in Romanesque style.

== Notable people ==
- Germanus of Auxerre (c. 378 – c. 442–448), bishop of Auxerre, missionary to Britain
- William of Auxerre (died 1231), early High Scholastic theologian from Auxerre
- Jean Baptiste Joseph Fourier (1768–1830), mathematician, experimental physicist and politician, born in Auxerre
- Paul Bert (1833–1886), physiologist and politician, born in Auxerre
- Louis Amable Crapelet (1822–1867), water-colour painter, born in Auxerre
- Théodore Frédéric Gaillardet, (1808–1882), journalist, publisher of French-language newspaper Courrier des États-Unis in New York City and mayor of Plessis-Bouchard, France, born in Auxerre
- Eugène Hatin (1809–1893), historian and bibliographer
- Saint Helladius (died 387), bishop of Auxerre
- Paul Monceaux (1859–1941), historian, born in Auxerre
- Marie Noël (1883-1967), Poet, born in Auxerre
- Benoît Mourlon (born 1988), footballer
- Jean-Paul Rappeneau (1932), film director, born in Auxerre
- Guy Roux (1938), coach of AJ Auxerre for more than 40 years, holding the French record of 894 games in Ligue 1

== Specialties ==
- Gougère – baked choux pastry made of dough mixed with cheese.
- Kir – a traditional aperitif mixed drink from Burgundy wine (traditionally Bourgogne Aligoté) and blackcurrant liqueur.
- Bœuf bourguignon – a typical main dish made of beef and vegetables.
- Truffe bourguignonne – truffles from Burgundy.

== Regional wines ==
- Chablis: a white wine made exclusively of Chardonnay in the Chablis AOC
- Saint-Bris AOC: the only white wine in Burgundy made of Sauvignon grapes, especially Sauvignon blanc and Sauvignon gris
- Irancy: a red wine from the surrounding area made of Pinot noir
- Bourgogne côte d'Auxerre: belonging to the Burgundy AOC (wine), it is made of Chardonnay for the white wine and Pinot noir for the red.
- Crémant de Bourgogne: sparkling wine following the tradition of Champagne, Crémant de Bourgogne has a strong production in and around Auxerre.
- Bourgogne Aligoté: dry wine. Aligoté is the second most popular white grape variety grown in Burgundy after Chardonnay.

The whole region of Burgundy produces over 200 million bottles per year.

== Twin towns – sister cities ==
Auxerre is twinned with:

- Greve in Chianti, Italy
- Płock, Poland
- Redditch, England, United Kingdom
- Roscoff, France
- Saint-Amarin, France
- Worms, Germany

== See also ==
- County of Auxerre
- Bishopric of Auxerre
- Cathédrale Saint-Étienne d'Auxerre
- Lady of Auxerre
- Saint Germanus of Auxerre
- Remigius of Auxerre
- William of Auxerre
- Communes of the Yonne department
- AJ Auxerre, the local football club
