= Robert Clergerie =

French fashion designer

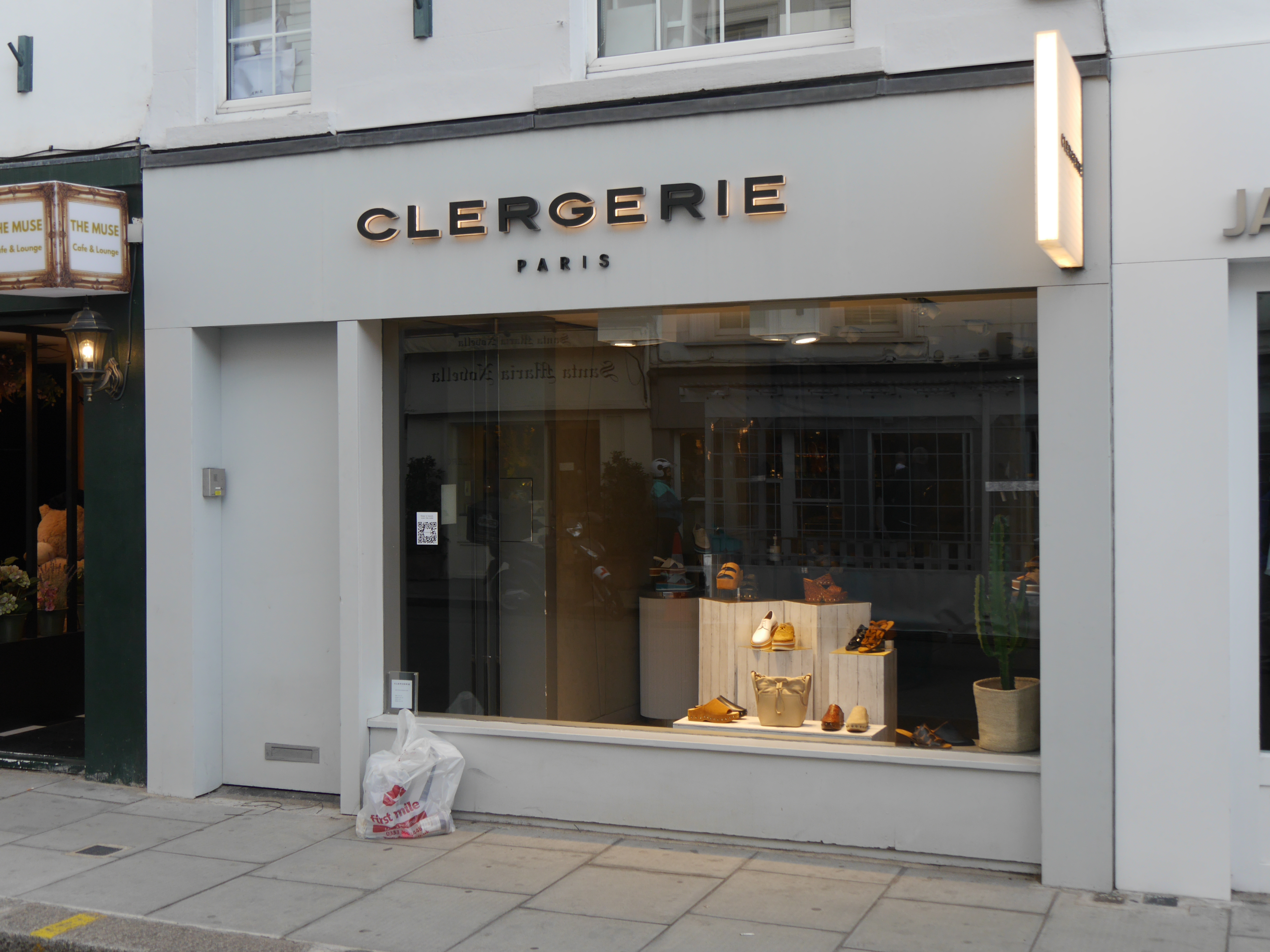
Clergerie store, Walton Street, London, 2022

Robert Clergerie is a French men's and women's shoe designer and founder of the eponymous label, with 21 stores worldwide.

Clergerie started his career in 1970, working for Charles Jourdan, and in 1978 bought the Joseph Fenestrier shoe factory in the town of Romans-sur-Isère, before launching his label there, making shoes.

Roland Mouret took over as creative director at La Maison Robert Clergerie in 2011.

On 29 March 2023, Clergerie Paris was placed in receivership in France, blaming poor cash flow and a rise in losses as part of the decision. In July 2023, Clergerie Paris was sold to Titan Industries.

On 4 December 2024, Clergerie Paris was placed in receivership for the second time in nearly two years. Titan Industries claimed that they were unable to restructure the company and blamed continued losses as a result of the filing. On 8 April 2025, Clergerie Paris was placed into liquidation after the only bid made to acquire the company was rejected by a commercial court. In May 2025, Clergerie Paris was sold once again, this time to Petrel 92 SL.
