= Romans-sur-Isère =

Romans-sur-Isère Rumans (Occitan)
- Commune
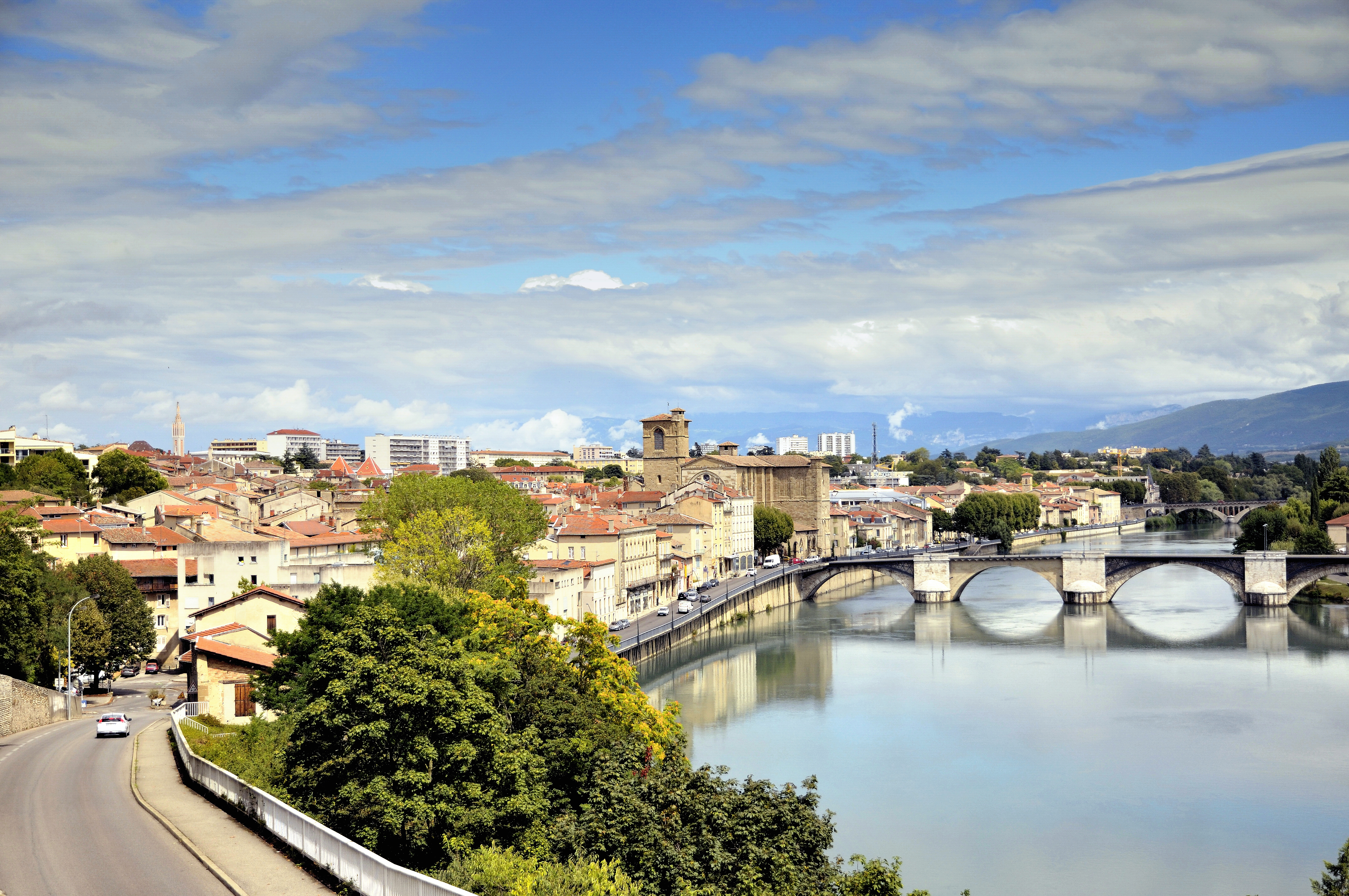
- A view of Romans-sur-Isère and the river Isère

- Coat of arms
- Location of Romans-sur-Isère
- Location within France Location within Auvergne-Rhône-Alpes
- Coordinates: 45°02′47″N 5°03′06″E
- Country: France
- Region: Auvergne-Rhône-Alpes
- Department: Drôme
- Arrondissement: Valence
- Canton: Romans-sur-Isère and Bourg-de-Péage
- Intercommunality: CA Valence Romans Agglo

Government
  - Mayor (2020–2026): Marie-Hélène Thoraval
- Area^{1}: 33.08 km^{2} (12.77 sq mi)
- Elevation: 167 m (548 ft)
- Highest elevation: 291 m (955 ft)
- Lowest elevation: 122 m (400 ft)
- Population (2023): 33,464
  - Density: 1,012/km^{2} (2,620/sq mi)
- Demonym: Romanais
- Time zone: UTC+01:00 (CET)
  - Summer (DST): UTC+02:00 (CEST)
- INSEE/Postal code: 26281 /26100
- Website: www.ville-romans.fr
- ^{1} French Land Register data, which excludes lakes, ponds, glaciers > 1 km^{2} (0.386 sq mi or 247 acres) and river estuaries.

Romans-sur-Isère (French pronunciation: [ʁɔmɑ̃syʁizɛːʁ]; lit. 'Romans-on-Isère'; known simply as Romans until 1920; Occitan: Rumans or Rumans d'Isèra; Old Occitan: Romans) is a commune in the Drôme department in Southeastern France. With a population of about 33,000, it is the third-most populous city in Drôme after Valence and Montélimar.

== Geography ==
Romans-sur-Isère is on the right bank of the river Isère, 20 km (12 mi) northeast of Valence. There are more than 50,000 inhabitants in the urban area including the neighbouring town of Bourg-de-Péage across the river. Romans is close to the Vercors.

== History ==
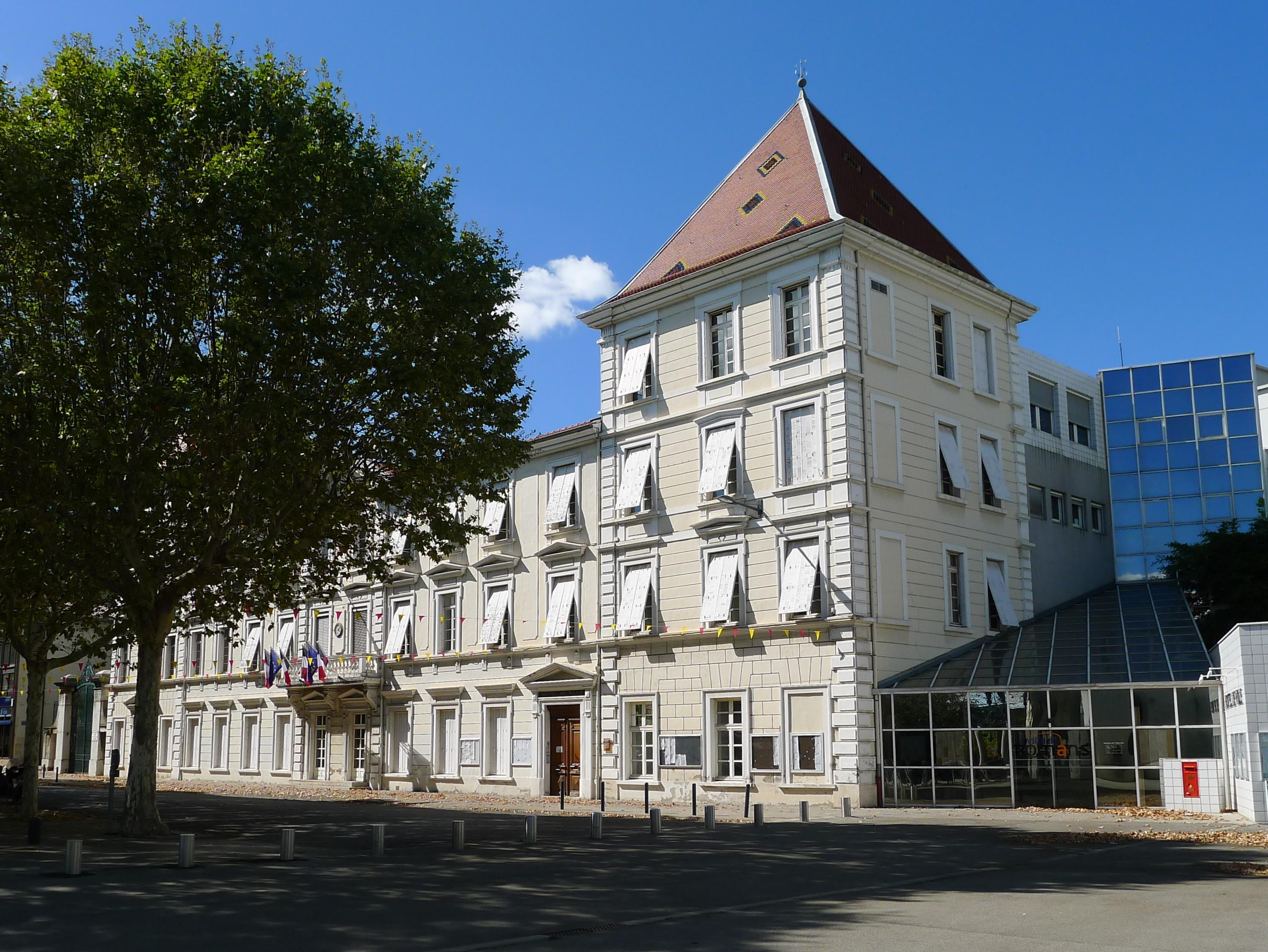
The Hôtel de Ville

About twenty artisans were killed at the annual carnival in the town in 1580.

The Hôtel de Ville was completed in 1802.

On 18 July 2017, the city was the end point for Stage 16 of the Tour de France.

== Population ==
Historical population

Year	Pop.	±% p.a.
1793	5,742	—
1800	6,473	+1.73%
1806	6,997	+1.31%
1821	8,837	+1.57%
1831	9,285	+0.50%
1836	9,972	+1.44%
1841	9,471	−1.03%
1846	9,958	+1.01%
1851	10,869	+1.77%
1856	11,219	+0.64%
1861	11,257	+0.07%
1866	11,524	+0.47%
1872	12,674	+1.60%
1876	12,923	+0.49%
1881	13,806	+1.33%
1886	14,733	+1.31%
1891	16,545	+2.35%
1896	16,702	+0.19%
1901	17,140	+0.52%

Year	Pop.	±% p.a.
1906	17,622	+0.56%
1911	17,201	−0.48%
1921	17,054	−0.09%
1926	17,596	+0.63%
1931	18,957	+1.50%
1936	19,489	+0.56%
1946	22,171	+1.30%
1954	22,559	+0.22%
1962	26,377	+1.97%
1968	31,545	+3.03%
1975	33,030	+0.66%
1982	33,152	+0.05%
1990	32,734	−0.16%
1999	32,667	−0.02%
2007	33,234	+0.22%
2012	33,701	+0.28%
2017	33,160	−0.32%
2023	33,464	+0.15%

Source: EHESS and INSEE (1968–2023)

== Transport ==
Romans-sur-Isère is served by Romans–Bourg-de-Péage station on the Valence–Moirans railway.

== Economy ==
- Nuclear fuel manufacture (FBFC, Franco-Belge de Fabrication du Combustible), Framatome subsidiary.
- Shoe manufacture (including Robert Clergerie)

== Sights ==
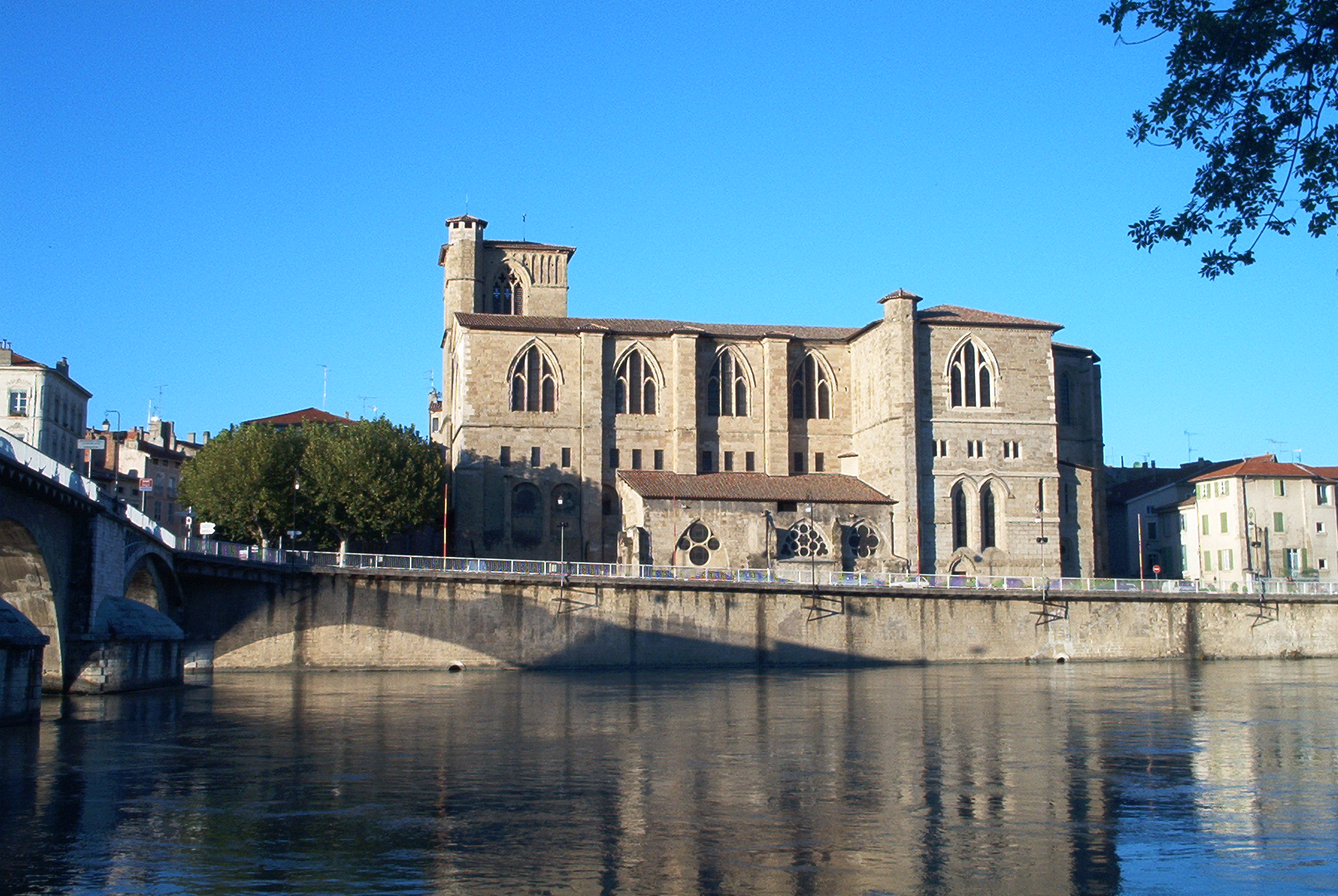
Collegiate Church of Saint-Barnard

Sights in Romans-sur-Isère include:

- The Collegiate Church of Saint-Barnard
- The International Museum of Footwear
- The Tower of Jacquemart clock

== Twin towns and sister cities ==
Romans-sur-Isère is twinned with:

- Coalville, England, United Kingdom
- Corsano, Italy
- Straubing, Germany
- Varese, Italy
- Zadar, Croatia
- Zlín, Czech Republic

== Notable people ==
- Hippolyte Charles (1773-1837), lover of Joséphine Bonaparte
- Robert Clergerie, shoe designer
- Érik Comas (1963-), former Formula One driver
- Pierre Latour (1993-), cyclist
- Jules Nadi (1872-1928), former mayor and councilor who did much to develop the city
- Baptiste Reynet, professional footballer
- Philippe Saint-André, rugby player and national team coach
- Thomas Arthur, Comte de Lally, general of Irish Jacobite ancestry

== Climate ==
Climate data for Romans-sur-Isère (1991–2020 normals, extremes 1990–present)
Month	Jan	Feb	Mar	Apr	May	Jun	Jul	Aug	Sep	Oct	Nov	Dec	Year
Record high °C (°F)	22.1 (71.8)	22.2 (72.0)	25.9 (78.6)	30.1 (86.2)	34.5 (94.1)	39.5 (103.1)	41.1 (106.0)	40.8 (105.4)	35.0 (95.0)	30.0 (86.0)	23.8 (74.8)	18.6 (65.5)	41.1 (106.0)
Mean daily maximum °C (°F)	8.1 (46.6)	9.9 (49.8)	14.7 (58.5)	18.2 (64.8)	22.4 (72.3)	26.6 (79.9)	29.3 (84.7)	29.0 (84.2)	24.0 (75.2)	18.7 (65.7)	12.4 (54.3)	8.4 (47.1)	18.5 (65.3)
Daily mean °C (°F)	4.4 (39.9)	5.4 (41.7)	9.1 (48.4)	12.2 (54.0)	16.3 (61.3)	20.2 (68.4)	22.3 (72.1)	22.1 (71.8)	17.9 (64.2)	13.7 (56.7)	8.4 (47.1)	5.0 (41.0)	13.1 (55.6)
Mean daily minimum °C (°F)	0.8 (33.4)	0.9 (33.6)	3.5 (38.3)	6.2 (43.2)	10.3 (50.5)	13.7 (56.7)	15.4 (59.7)	15.1 (59.2)	11.7 (53.1)	8.8 (47.8)	4.4 (39.9)	1.5 (34.7)	7.7 (45.9)
Record low °C (°F)	−13.2 (8.2)	−10.3 (13.5)	−11.2 (11.8)	−6.5 (20.3)	0.9 (33.6)	5.3 (41.5)	7.1 (44.8)	5.1 (41.2)	1.7 (35.1)	−4.2 (24.4)	−9.1 (15.6)	−12.0 (10.4)	−13.2 (8.2)
Average precipitation mm (inches)	52.3 (2.06)	41.8 (1.65)	51.5 (2.03)	72.9 (2.87)	83.7 (3.30)	66.1 (2.60)	59.0 (2.32)	68.8 (2.71)	104.4 (4.11)	115.8 (4.56)	106.0 (4.17)	54.4 (2.14)	876.7 (34.52)
Average precipitation days (≥ 1.0 mm)	8.0	6.9	7.3	8.4	8.8	6.9	6.5	6.3	6.3	9.2	9.3	8.2	92.3
Source: Meteociel

== See also ==
- Communes of the Drôme department
- Vercors Regional Natural Park
