= Henri Laudier =

French journalist and politician

Mayor
- In office 1919–1943
- Constituency: Bourges

Senator of the French Third Republic
- In office 1930–1943
- Constituency: Cher

Personal details
- Born: 20 February 1878 Vierzon, Cher, France
- Died: 10 October 1943 (aged 65) Bourges, Cher, France
- Occupation: Journalist

Henri Laudier (20 February 1878 – 10 October 1943) was a French journalist and politician.

== Biography ==
He was born at Vierzon, Cher department, France. In his early years he was a tailor and a town clerk before becoming a journalist. Laudier was the editor of Tocsin, a socialist weekly publication. He served the General Counsel of Bourges before becoming the mayor of Bourges from 1919 to 1943. He was a member of the French Section of the Workers' International (Section Française de l'Internationale Ouvrière) from 1919 to 1924. His book, Ce qu'est le parti socialiste was published in 1919 by SFIO's Librairie du parti socialiste. Laudier was a member of the Chamber of Deputies (1919-1924). He was a Senator of the French Third Republic representing Cher elected in 1930 and reelected 1939, with his term ending upon his death in 1943. On 10 July 1940, he voted as a Senator in favour of granting the cabinet presided by Marshal Philippe Pétain authority to draw up a new constitution, thereby effectively ending the French Third Republic and establishing Vichy France. He died in Bourges, Cher, France.
