= Valentin de Bournonville =

Valentin de Bournonville (c. 1610 – 18 March 1684) was a French Baroque composer and music master active in the middle of the 17th century.

== Biography ==
Valentin de Bournonville was the son of Jean de Bournonville, and trained by his father in the mastery of the Amiens Cathedral. He was a priest. In 1634 he took over the position of master of the children of the cathedral, succeeding Artus Aux-Cousteaux, who himself had succeeded Jean de Bournonville. In 1643, an act of 23 July shows him depositing his almuce on the desk of the chapter as a sign of obedience, like the other vicars and chaplains of the cathedral. In 1646, when he had two masses published by Robert III Ballard, he is said to be a canon of the church of St. Firmin d'Amiens and master of the children of the cathedral church of that city. He was also endowed with the Vicariate Chapel of Saint-Quentin.

Valentin de Bournonville then moved to Paris, being appointed on 27 August 1646 as the music master of the Cathédrale Notre-Dame de Paris, until 20 March 1653, succeeding here François Cosset. On 14 April 1651, the chapter reminded him that during the days of great feast, only a psalm and the magnificat were to be sung in music, and the rest by plain chant only. On 21 September 1651 he had been invited by Pierre Robert, then music master of the Chartres Cathedral, to sing there. On 15 April 1652, he was reprimanded at the time of the Chapter session for not showing enough severity towards the children of the choir and obtaining only insufficient progress. In 1653, the chapter granted him a profit of the Église Saint-Jean-le-Rond de Paris.

He succeeded Pierre Robert as music master at the cathedral of Chartres until 1662. He was sometimes called upon in the same way as Pierre Robert to attest to the good quality of the plainchant works by Guillaume-Gabriel Nivers, this double approval being given on 14 December 1657. He also signed the approval of the Directorium chori by Martin Sonnet in 1656.

He reappeared at Notre-Dame de Paris from October 1663 to the following 1 December, when he was replaced. Several successive appointments may indicate a period of turmoil in the leadership of the choir (Martin Candelot, Pierre Cheneveuillet, Pierre Robert), before things stabilized in August 1664 with the arrival of Jean Mignon. This situation and the disappearance of Valentin de Bournonville from the records led to speculation that he had died at the end of 1663 or in 1664. A report dated 18 March 1684 relating to the recent death of “Mr. Valantin [sic] Bournonville [...] prebstre chanoine de saint Denis du Pas” suggests that the composer had in fact retired during the last twenty years of his life to this small parish church, adjacent to Notre-Dame.

He was also quoted by Annibal Gantez, in 1643: comme un [Jean de] Bournonville qui est mort maistre de la Saincte Chapelle, et qui a laissé son fils aussi vertueux que luy maistre de l'Église d’Amiens.

== Works ==
- Missa quatuor vocum ad imitationem moduli Salve regina. - Paris : Robert III Ballard, 1646. 2°, 14 f. Manque au RISM, Guillo 2003 n° 1646-B.

Modern edition by Erich Schwandt: Victoria (B.C.), Éditions Jeu, 1981 (Valentin de Bournonville, Complete works).

- Missa quatuor vocum ad imitationem Videant amici. - Paris, Robert III Ballard, [1646]. 2°, 14 f. Manque au RISM, Guillo 2003 n°1646-C.

The only known copy is incomplete at the beginning. Modern edition by Erich Schwandt: Victoria (B.C.), Éditions Jeu, 1981 (Valentin de Bournonville, Complete works).

== Sources ==
- François Léon Chartier, L'ancien chapitre de Notre-Dame de Paris et sa maîtrise, d'après les documents capitulaires (1326-1790). Paris: 1897.
- Jules-Alexandre Clerval, L’ancienne maîtrise de N.-D. de Chartres. Chartres: Selleret, 1898. Reprint: Geneva, Minkoff, 1972.
- Georges Durand, La musique de la cathédrale d'Amiens avant la Révolution, Bulletin de la Société des antiquaires de Picardie 29 (1920–1922), p. 329–457. Reprint in La vie musicale dans les provinces françaises : 1 (Geneva, 1971).
- Annibal Gantez, L’Entretien des musiciens. Auxerre: 1643. Reprint by Ernest Thoinan: Paris, 1878.
- Laurent Guillo, Pierre I Ballard et Robert III Ballard : imprimeurs du roy pour la musique (1599–1673). Liege : Mardaga et Versailles : CMBV, 2003. 2 vol.
- Denise Launay, La musique religieuse en France du Concile de Trente à 1804, Paris: Société française de musicologie et Éditions Klincksieck, 1993.
- Jean-Paul Montagnier, The Polyphonic Mass in France, 1600-1780: The Evidence of the Printed Choirbooks, Cambridge: Cambridge University Press, 2017.
- Grégory Rauber, Chanter par le Si en France au XVIIe siècle : pionniers et prémisses du solfège moderne, Turnhout, Brepols, 2025.
- Erich Schwandt, Some 17th-century French unica in Canada : notes for RISM. In Fontes Artis Musicæ 27/3-4 (1980), p. 172-174.
- Anne-Marie Yvon-Briand, La vie musicale à Notre-Dame de Paris aux XVIIe et XVIIIe siècles. Thèse de l'École des Chartes, Paris, 1949, 2 vol.
