= Jean de Bournonville =

French composer

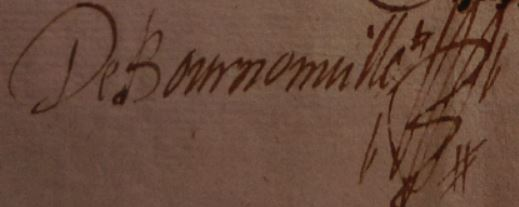
Jean de Bournonville's signature

Jean de Bournonville was a French composer active in the first third of the 17th century, born in Noyon around 1585 and died in Paris on 27 May 1632. He should not be confused with his son Valentin de Bournonville, who published masses in the middle of the 17th century.

== Biography ==
=== Noyon ===
The 1612 Octo Cantica state that he was born in Noyon, but his year of birth is unknown.

=== Saint-Quentin ===
The same collection indicates him at that time as master of the children of the collegiate church of Saint-Quentin. In 1613 Bournonville offered to the chapter of the Cambrai Cathedral a bound collection of his masses (probably the Parisian editions of Pierre I Ballard). He remained in Saint-Quentin until about 1618.

In the 1610s, he won first prizes at the puys de musique of Rouen, Évreux and Abbeville.

=== Amiens ===
Bournonville was in Amiens before 1619: he was appointed maître de chapelle (symphoniarca) of the Amiens Cathedral with respect to his 1619 Missae tredecim. We know an expertise of reception of the organ of the cathedral signed by his hand on 23 June 1623, also signed by Henri Frémart and Jehan Titelouze, which suggests that he was an organist.

=== Paris ===
He ended his career at the Sainte-Chapelle du Palais in Paris, where he was appointed director of the master's degree on 6 December 1631, replacing Jacques Du Moustier who died on 6 December 1631. He took possession of his post on 3 January 1632, after taking an oath, and was installed "in the lower chairs on the right side, not having the order of priesthood". Offering such a position to a non-ecclesiastical musician was unusual; it can be inferred that it was his qualities that earned him such an offer. He did not work long, dying on 27 May 1632.

=== Legacy ===
He was also mentioned by Annibal Gantez, in 1643: comme un Bournonville qui est mort maistre de la Saincte Chapelle, et qui a laissé son fils aussi vertueux que luy maistre de l'Église d’Amiens. In addition to his son Valentin, he also had Artus Aux-Cousteaux as a student in Saint-Quentin in 1615.

== Works ==
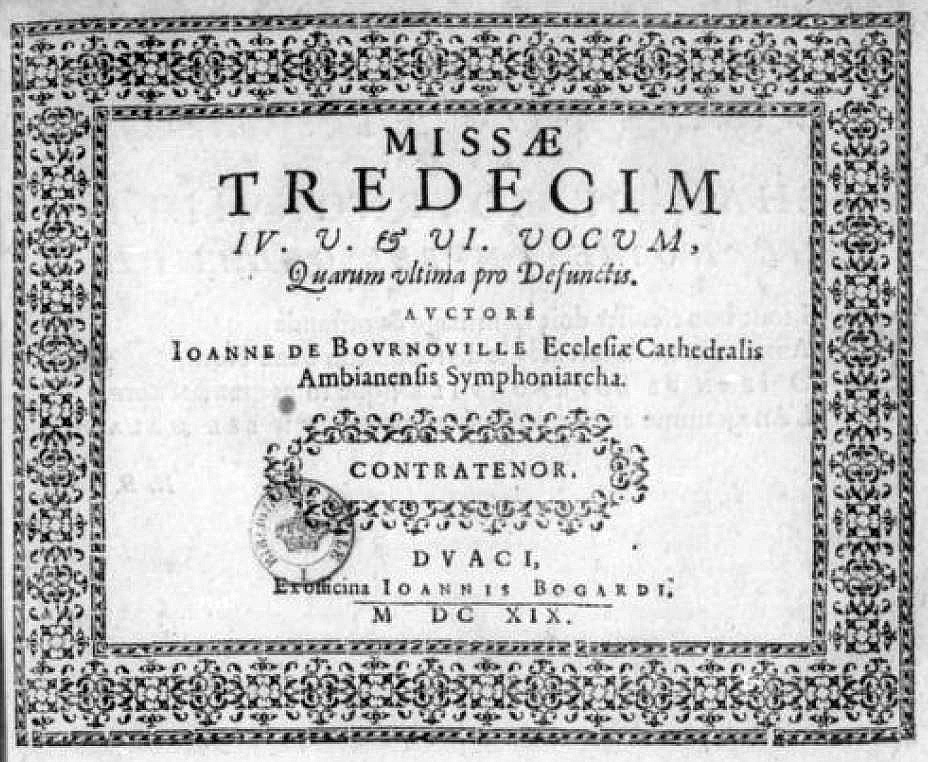
Title page of the Missae tredecim (Douai, 1619). Paris BNF (Mus.)

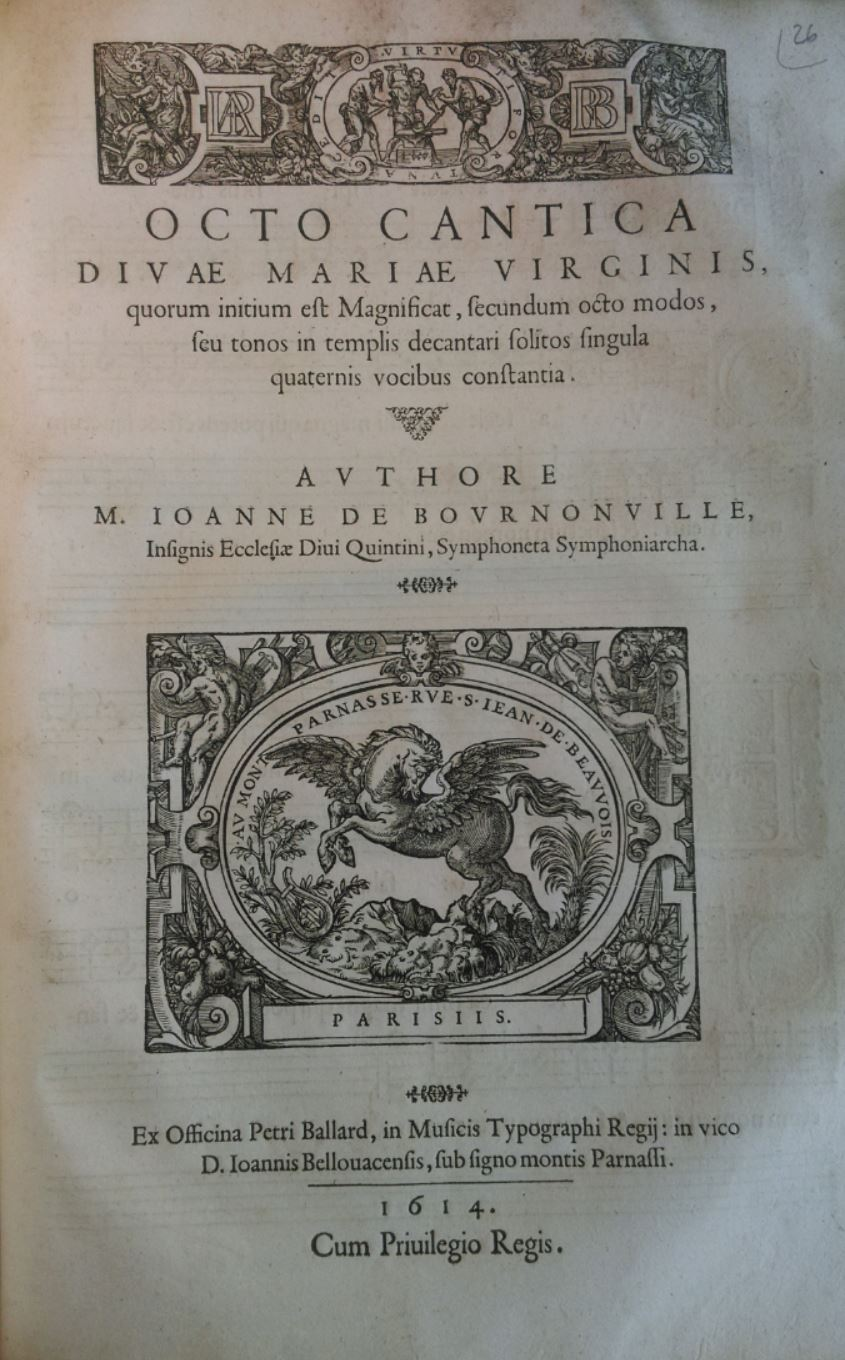
Title page of the Octo cantica de Bournonville (Paris, 1614). Paris ICP.

The known works of Bournonville are exclusively sacred and spiritual. They were well regarded by his contemporaries. In his writing, imitations are treated with flexibility and elegance. His counterpoint is of high quality and knows how to stay alive and spontaneous, as in the songs from which he sometimes draws inspiration for his masses (infringing the directives of the Council of Trent, which called for the abandonment of this profane inspiration).

=== Masses ===
There are nineteen of them, divided between Parisian volumes (including the Octo cantica of 1612/1625) and a Douaisian collection.

- Missa quatuor vocum. Ad imitationem moduli Ave maris stella. Paris: Pierre I Ballard, 1618. 1 vol. 2°. RISM B 3842, Guillo 2003 n° 1618-B.
- Missa quatuor vocum. Ad imitationem moduli Ave Maria. Paris: Pierre I Ballard, 1618. 1 vol. 2°. Guillo 2016 n° 1618-B2.

These two masses are part of a collection of Bournonville masses printed by the Ballard workshop between 1607 and 1618, which also contained the following volumes, all of which are lost: Sappi madonna (4 v.), Septimi toni (4 v.), Ad nutum Domini (6 v.), Heu mihi (4 v.), In nomine Jesu (5 v.), J’ay senti les deux maux (5 v.), Narcisse (5 v.), Nunc dimittis (5 v.), Par un matin d’esté (4 v.). They appeared before the Douai's collection of 1619 and some of them can be found there. Cf. Guillo 2003 n° ND-12 à ND-22. The Sappi Madonna mass is also known in an Italian manuscript.

- Missæ tredecim, quarum ultima pro defunctis. Douai: Jan Bogard, 1619. 6 vol. 4° obl. RISM B 3843, Persoons 1989 n° 45.

Dedication to the Bishop of Amiens François Lefèvre de Caumartin, 13 April 1619. Includes 13 masses: for 4 voices Ad libitum, Ave Maria, Ave maris stella, Heu mihi, Septimi toni; for 5 voices In cantu peregrinorum S. Jacobi, In nomine Jesu, Le rossignol, Nunc dimittis; for 6 voices Ad nutum Domini, Dessus le marché d'Arras, La guerre françoise (celle-ci inspirée par La bataille de Marignan by Clément Janequin), Pro defunctis. Gallica Read online.
The mass Ad libitum was published: revision and annotations by René-Marie Reboud. [for mixed choir with 5 voices]. - Paris: musical editions of the Schola Cantorum de Paris and the Procure générale de musique, [1953]. In-4°, 10 p.

=== Hymns and canticles ===
- Octo cantica Virginis matris quae vulgo magnificat dicuntur, cum hymnis communioribus penè totius anni, quibus additae sunt Diei Dominicae & natalis Domini vesperae. Secundum rituum Romanum. (4-5 v.). Paris: Pierre I Ballard, 1612. 4 vol. 4°. RISM B 3841, Guillo 2003 n° 1612-C.

Contains 8 magnificats, psalms, hymns, des antiennes à la Vierge, a Missa syllabica and a Missa Septimi toni. The music is in drones, and remains the same for each verse. These compositions are antiphonal (i.e. with alternating plain vocals and polyphony).
Collection reprinted in 1625 (unknown in the RISM, Guillo 2003 n° 1625-B). In the title, the mention of Saint-Quentin was not changed (while Bournonville was working in Amiens at the time). Gallica Read online.

- Octo cantica Divæ Mariæ Virginis, quorum initium est Magnificat, secundum octo modos, seu tonos in templis decantari solitos singula quaternis vocibus constantia. Paris: Pierre I Ballard, 1614. 1 vol. 2°. Guillo 2016 n° 1614-D2.

Contains 8 magnificats on the 8 tones, in antiphonal form. The writing is more elaborate than that of the 1612 collection.

=== Spiritual music ===
- Cinquante quatrains du sieur de Pybrac, set in music in ii, iii & iiii parties. Paris: Pierre I Ballard, 1622. 4 vol. 8° obl. RISM B 3844, Guillo 2003 n° 1622-B.

The edition follows the original order of the quatrains by Pibrac.

== Sources ==
- Brenet, Michel (1973). Les musiciens de la Sainte-Chapelle du Palais; documents inédits, recueillis et annotés par Michel Brenet (Paris, A. Picard, 1910) (pdf). Publications de la Société internationale de musique (in French). (pseudonym Marie Bobillier). Geneva: Éditions Minkoff. p. 379. ISBN 2826600419. OCLC 1149112.
- Georges Durand. La musique de la cathédrale d'Amiens avant la Révolution, Bulletin de la Société des antiquaires de Picardie 29 (1920–1922), (pp. 329–457). Reprint in La vie musicale dans les provinces françaises: 1 (Geneva, 1971). see (pp. 91–95).
- Annibal Gantez. L’Entretien des musiciens on Gallica. Auxerre: 1643. Reissued by Ernest Thoinan: Paris, 1878.
- Charles Gomart, Notes historiques sur la maîtrise de Saint-Quentin et sur les célébrités musicales de cette ville. Saint Quentin: 1851. Reprint in La vie musicale dans les provinces françaises: 1 (Geneva, 1971).
- Musiciens de Paris 1535–1792 d’après le Fichier Laborde. Publié par Yolande de Brossard. – Paris: Picard, 1965.
- Laurent Guillo, Découverte à la Bibliothèque de Fels (Institut catholique de Paris) d’un recueil de messes contenant des œuvres retrouvées de Titelouze, Du Caurroy, Fontenay and Bournonville (Paris, 1587–1626), Revue de musicologie 102/2 (2016), (pp. 379–394).
- Laurent Guillo. Pierre I Ballard et Robert III Ballard, imprimeurs du roy pour la musique (1599–1673). Sprimont et Versailles: 2003. 2 vol.
- Jules Houdoy, Histoire artistique de la cathédrale de Cambrai, ancienne église métropolitaine Notre Dame: comptes, inventaires et documents inédits... Paris: Morgand et Fatout, 1880.
- Denise Launay. La musique religieuse en France du concile de Trente à 1804 La musique religieuse en France du concile de Trente à 1804 on WorldCat. Paris: Société française de musicologie, 1993.
- Carol MacClintock. "New sources of Mantuan music". Journal of the American Musicological Society 22/3 (1969), (pp. 358–515).
- La Musique en Picardie du XIVe au XVIIe siècle, under the direction of Camilla Cavicchi, Marie-Alexis Colin and Philippe Vendrix. Turnhout: Brepols, 2012.
- Guido Persoons. Joannes I Bogard, Jean II Bogard en Pierre Bogard als muziekdrukkers te Douai van 1574 tot 1633 en hun betrekkingen met de Officina Plantiniana. Ex Officina Plantiniana: studia in memoriam Christophori Plantini (c. 1520 – 1589), ed. Marcus de Schepper & Francine de Nave. Antwerpen: Vereeniging der Antwerpsche Bibliophilien, 1989, (pp. 613–666).
- Jean-Paul Montagnier, The Polyphonic Mass in France, 1600–1780: The Evidence of the Printed Choirbooks, Cambridge: Cambridge University Press, 2017.

== Discography ==
- Jean Titelouze: Hymnes et Magnificat. Jean-Charles Ablitzer, historical organ of Saint-Miliau. Verse sung alternately, polyphonic and plain singing by Gérard Lesne, Josep Benet, Josep Cabré and Malcolm Bothwell. 1 CD Harmonic Records H/CD 9037, 1990. [The sung polyphonies are taken from Bournonville's collection of 1612/1625].
