= Berault =

Berault or Bérault may refer to:

Surname

- Pierre Berault
- Antoine Henri de Bérault-Bercastel, (1720–1794) French priest and Catholic historian

Given name

- Bérault Stuart (c. 1452–1508) French soldier and diplomat; English: Bernard Stewart, 4th Lord of Aubigny

Places

- Bérault station, a Paris Metro station

== See also ==
- Bernard
