= Descaves =

Descaves is a French surname. Notable people with the surname include:

- Lucette Descaves (1906–1993), French pianist and teacher
- Lucien Descaves (1861–1949), French novelist
- Pierre Descaves (1924–2014), French politician
