= Guillaume d'Ercuis =

French Roman Catholic priest (1265–1314/15)

Guillaume d'Ercuis (1265 – 1314/15) was the almoner to King Philip III of France and the tutor of his son, King Philip IV. He was a royal notary, and, as one of the King's men, a canon of the cathedrals of Laon, Noyon, Senlis, Mello, Marchais and of Reims, archdeacon of Laon and of Thiérache. He derived his name from his small seigneurie of Ercuis (Old French Arcuys or Erquez; Latin Arquetum) in the Beauvaisis between Neuilly-en-Thelle and Cires-lès-Mello, about 55 km from Paris. At Ercuis he erected a chapel dedicated to Virgin Mary, served by the monks of the Abbey of St Genevieve, Paris.

His parents were Guillaume d’Ercuis (1240-1302) and Helisende. His brother was called Jean; he was a servant to Philip IV.

Guillaume d'Ercuis kept a journal, his livre de raison noting his expenses for the purchase of domains, of furnishings and books. Some annotations relate to his personal life and to court life.

His descendant, H. Coustant d'Yanville, published a Notice sur Guillaume d'Ercuis, précepteur de Philippe le Bel (Beauvais 1864).
