= Philip IV of France =

King of France from 1285 to 1314

Philip IV
- Manuscript portrait of Philip IV, c. 1313

King of France
- Reign: 5 October 1285 – 29 November 1314
- Coronation: 6 January 1286, Reims Cathedral
- Predecessor: Philip III
- Successor: Louis X

King of Navarre
- Reign: 16 August 1284 – 2 April 1305
- Predecessor: Joan I
- Successor: Louis I
- Co-monarch: Joan I
- Born: 8 April – June 1268; Palace of Fontainebleau, France
- Died: 29 November 1314 (aged 46); Fontainebleau, France
- Burial: 3 December 1314; Saint Denis Basilica
- Spouse: Joan I of Navarre (m. 1284; died 1305)
- Issue more...: Louis X, King of France; Philip V, King of France; Charles IV, King of France; Isabella, Queen of England; Robert of France
- House: Capet
- Father: Philip III of France
- Mother: Isabella of Aragon

Philip IV (April–June 1268 – 29 November 1314), called Philip the Fair (French: Philippe le Bel), was King of France from 1285 to 1314. By virtue of his marriage with Joan I of Navarre, he was also King of Navarre and Count of Champagne as Philip I from 1284 to 1305. Although Philip was known to be handsome, hence the epithet le Bel, his rigid, autocratic, imposing, and inflexible personality gained him (from friend and foe alike) other nicknames, such as the Iron King (French: le Roi de fer). His fierce opponent Bernard Saisset, bishop of Pamiers, said of him: "He is neither man nor beast. He is a statue." (Note: "Ce n'est ni un homme ni une bête. C'est une statue.")

Philip, seeking to reduce the wealth and power of the nobility and clergy, relied instead on educated and skilful civil servants, such as Guillaume de Nogaret and Enguerrand de Marigny, to govern the kingdom. The king, who sought an uncontested monarchy, compelled his vassals by wars and restricted their feudal privileges, paving the way for the transformation of France from a feudal country to a centralised early modern state. Internationally, Philip's ambitions made him highly influential in European affairs, and for much of his reign, he sought to place his relatives on foreign thrones. Princes from his house ruled in Hungary and in the Kingdom of Naples, and he tried and failed to make another relative the Holy Roman Emperor.

The most notable conflicts of Philip's reign include a dispute with the English over King Edward I's duchy in southwestern France and a war with the County of Flanders, who had rebelled against French royal authority and humiliated Philip at the Battle of the Golden Spurs in 1302. The war with the Flemish resulted in Philip's ultimate victory, after which he received a significant portion of Flemish cities, which were added to the crown lands along with a vast sum of money. Domestically, his reign was marked by struggles with the Jews and the Knights Templar. In heavy debt to both groups, Philip saw them as a "state within the state" and a recurring threat to royal power. In 1306 Philip expelled the Jews from France, followed by the total destruction of the Knights Templar in 1307. To further strengthen the monarchy, Philip tried to tax and impose state control over the Catholic Church in France, leading to a violent dispute with Pope Boniface VIII. The ensuing conflict saw the pope's residence at Anagni attacked in September 1303 by French forces with the support of the Colonna family. Pope Boniface was captured and held hostage for several days. This eventually led to the Avignon Papacy of 1309 to 1376.

His final year saw a scandal amongst the royal family, known as the Tour de Nesle affair, in which King Philip's three daughters-in-law were accused of adultery. His three sons were successively kings of France: Louis X, Philip V, and Charles IV. Their rapid successive deaths without surviving sons of their own would compromise the future of the French royal house, which had until then seemed secure, precipitating a succession crisis that eventually led to the Hundred Years' War (1337–1453).

== Youth ==
A member of the House of Capet, Philip was born in 1268 in the medieval fortress of Fontainebleau (Seine-et-Marne) to the future Philip III, the Bold, and his first wife, Isabella of Aragon. His father was the heir apparent of France, being the eldest surviving son of King Louis IX.

In August 1270, when Philip was two years old, his grandfather died while on Crusade, his father became king, and his elder brother Louis became heir apparent. Only five months later, in January 1271, Philip's mother died after falling from a horse; she was pregnant with her fifth child at the time and had not yet been crowned queen beside her husband. A few months later, one of Philip's younger brothers, Robert, also died. Philip's father was finally crowned king at Rheims on 15 August 1271. Six days later, he married again; Philip's stepmother was Marie, daughter of the duke of Brabant.

In May 1276, Philip's elder brother Louis died, and the eight-year-old Philip became heir apparent. It was suspected that Louis had been poisoned and that his stepmother, Marie of Brabant, had instigated the murder. One reason for these rumours was that the queen had given birth to her own first son the month Louis died. However, both Philip and his surviving full brother Charles lived well into adulthood and raised large families of their own.

The scholastic part of Philip's education was entrusted to Guillaume d'Ercuis, his father's almoner.

After the unsuccessful Aragonese Crusade against Peter III of Aragon, which ended in October 1285, Philip may have negotiated an agreement with Peter for the safe withdrawal of the Crusader army. This pact is attested to by Catalan chroniclers. Joseph Strayer points out that such a deal was probably unnecessary, as Peter had little to gain from provoking a battle with the withdrawing French or angering the young Philip, who had friendly relations with Aragon through his mother.

Philip married Queen Joan I of Navarre (1271–1305) on 16 August 1284. The two were affectionate and devoted to each other and Philip refused to remarry after Joan's death in 1305, despite the great political and financial rewards of doing so. The primary administrative benefit of the marriage was Joan's inheritance of Champagne and Brie, which were adjacent to the royal demesne in Ile-de-France, and thus effectively were united to the king's own lands, expanding his realm. The annexation of wealthy Champagne increased the royal revenues considerably, removed the autonomy of a large semi-independent fief and expanded royal territory eastward. Philip also gained Lyon for France in 1312.

Navarre remained in personal union with France, beginning in 1284 under Philip and Joan, for 44 years. The Kingdom of Navarre in the Pyrenees was poor but had a degree of strategic importance. When in 1328 the Capetian line went extinct, the new Valois king, Philip VI, attempted to permanently annex the lands to France, compensating the lawful claimant, Joan II of Navarre, senior heir of Philip IV, with lands elsewhere in France. However, pressure from Joan II's family led to Phillip VI surrendering the land to Joan in 1329, and the rulers of Navarre and France were again different individuals.

== Reign ==
After marrying Joan I of Navarre, and becoming Philip I of Navarre, Philip ascended the French throne at the age of 17. He was crowned as King on 6 January 1286 in Reims. As king, Philip was determined to strengthen the monarchy at any cost. He relied, more than any of his predecessors, on a professional bureaucracy of legalists. To the public he kept aloof, and left specific policies, especially unpopular ones, to his ministers; as such he was compared to a "useless owl" by Bishop Saisset. Others like William of Nogaret idealized him, praising him for his piety and support of the Church. His reign marks the transition to a more centralized administration, characterized by the emergence or consolidation of the King's Council, the Parlement and the Court of Auditors, a move, under a certain historical reading, towards modernity.

== Foreign policy and wars ==
=== War against England ===
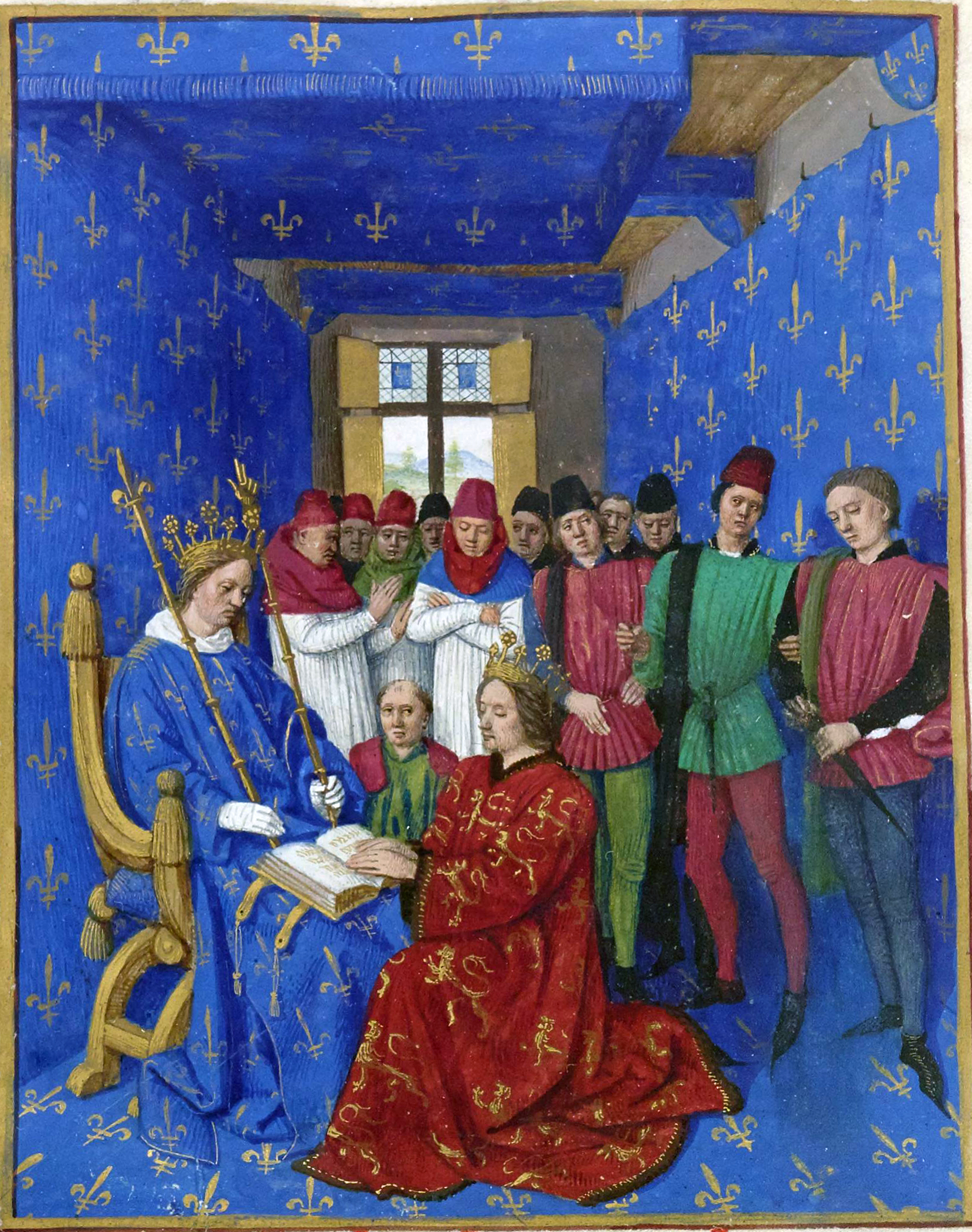
Homage of Edward I (kneeling) to Philip IV (seated). As duke of Aquitaine, Edward was a vassal to the French king. Illumination made in the 15th century by Jean Fouquet.

As the duke of Aquitaine, English King Edward I was a vassal to Philip and had to pay him homage. Following the Fall of Acre in 1291, however, the former allies started to show dissent.

In 1293, following feuding between English and French sailors that led to several seized ships and the sacking of La Rochelle, Philip summoned Edward to the French court. The English king sought to negotiate the matter via ambassadors sent to Paris, but they were turned away with a blunt refusal. Philip addressed Edward as a duke, a vassal, and nothing more, despite the international implications of the relationship between England and France.

Edward next attempted to use family connections to achieve what open politics had not. He sent his brother Edmund Crouchback, who was Philip's cousin as well as his step-father-in-law, in attempts to negotiate with the French royal family and avert war. Additionally, Edward had by that time become betrothed by proxy to Philip's sister Margaret, and, in the event of the negotiations being successful, Edmund was to escort Margaret back to England for her wedding to Edward.

An agreement was indeed reached; it stated that Edward would temporarily relinquish Gascony to Philip as a sign of submission in his capacity as the duke of Aquitaine. In return, Philip would forgive Edward and restore Gascony after a grace period. Philip would also revoke the previous summons to Edward to appear in the parliament of Paris, and meet the English king at Amiens. It was further agreed that Edward was to marry Philip IV's sister Margaret. On 3 February 1294, orders were given by Edward I to allow the French to take possession of the Gascon strongholds.

Philip IV, however, again summoned Edward I on 21 April, to appear personally before the French court. Edward rejected the summons, and on 19 May he was forfeited of Aquitaine, Gascony and other French possessions for failure to appear in person. A French army was then sent to occupy the confiscated territories. In response Edward I renounced his homage to Philip IV and began preparations for war.

The ensuing 1294–1303 Gascon War was the inevitable result of the competitive expansionist monarchies, but the direct campaigns between the two countries in Aquitaine and Flanders were inconclusive. Instead, the larger consequences were from the taxation undertaken to pay for them and in the alliances used. France initiated the Auld Alliance between itself and Scotland, underwriting much of the prolonged First Scottish War of Independence. Meanwhile, England assisted Flanders in its own war against France; the decimation of a generation of French nobility at the Battle of the Golden Spurs forced Philip to abandon his occupation of Aquitaine.

Pursuant to the terms of the interim 1299 Treaty of Montreuil, the marriage of Philip's young daughter Isabella to Edward's son Edward II was celebrated at Boulogne on 25 January 1308. Meant to further seal a lasting peace, it eventually produced an English claimant to the French throne itself, leading to the Hundred Years' War.

=== War with Flanders ===
As soon as Philip became king in 1285, he intervened continuously in the conflict between Guy of Dampierre, Count of Flanders and the big towns of Flanders, Ghent, Bruges and Ypres. After much legalist action through the parlement of Paris, Guy finally sought an alliance with the English King Edward I and renounced his fealty to Philip. This led to the Franco-Flemish War in 1297. In 1300 Guy surrendered to Philip, the county of Flanders was annexed to France and the count of Flanders was replaced with a governor. The French governor Jacques de Châtillon imposed harsh measures and taxes on the cities, which ignated a revolt at Bruges and rallied the cities around the count of Flanders. On 11 July 1302 these town militia and few Flemish nobles won an unexpected victory over the French army at the Battle of the Golden Spurs. But finally the French prevailed at the battle of Mons-en-Pévèle in 1304 and with the subsequent treaty of Athis-sur-Orge (1305) Flanders lost the rich cloth cities of Lille, Douai and Orchies to France and had to pay exorbitant fines but retained its independence as a fief of the French kingdom.

=== Crusades and diplomacy with Mongols ===
Philip had various contacts with the Mongol power in the Middle East, including reception at the embassy of the Uyghur monk Rabban Bar Sauma, originally from the Yuan dynasty of China. Bar Sauma presented an offer of a Franco-Mongol alliance with Arghun of the Mongol Ilkhanate in Baghdad. Arghun was seeking to join forces between the Mongols and the Europeans, against their common enemy the Muslim Mamluks. In return, Arghun offered to return Jerusalem to the Christians, once it was re-captured from the Muslims. Philip seemingly responded positively to the request of the embassy by sending one of his noblemen, Gobert de Helleville, to accompany Bar Sauma back to Mongol lands. There was further correspondence between Arghun and Philip in 1288 and 1289, outlining potential military cooperation. However, Philip never actually pursued such military plans.

In April 1305, the new Mongol ruler Öljaitü sent letters to Philip, the Pope, and Edward I of England. He again offered a military collaboration between the Christian nations of Europe and the Mongols against the Mamluks. European nations attempted another Crusade but were delayed, and it never took place. On 4 April 1312, another Crusade was promulgated at the Council of Vienne. In 1313, Philip "took the cross", making the vow to go on a Crusade in the Levant, thus responding to Pope Clement V's call. He was, however, warned against leaving by Enguerrand de Marigny and died soon after in a hunting accident.

== Finance and religion ==
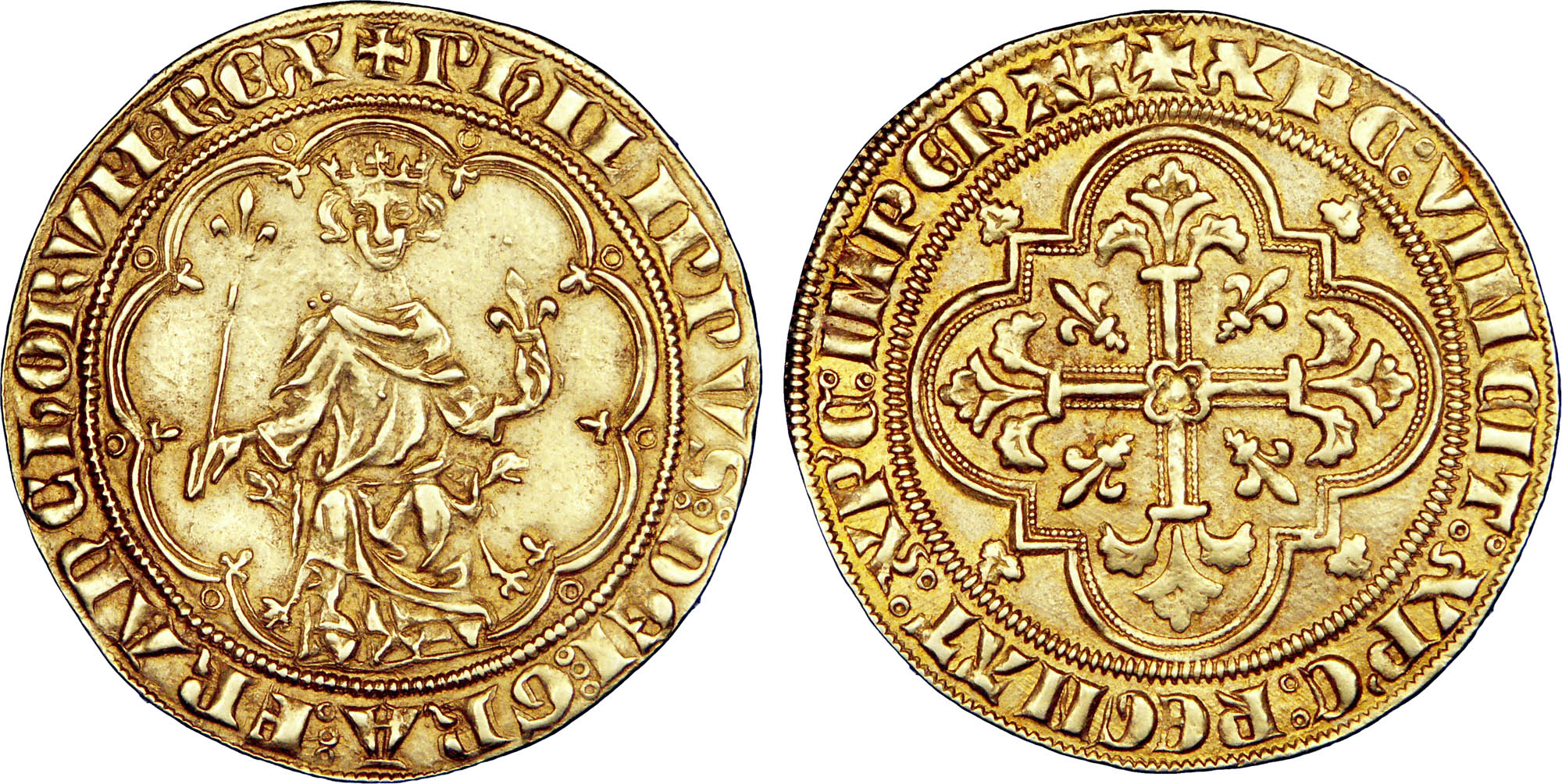
Masse d'or (7,04 g) during Philip the Fair's reign

=== Mounting deficits ===
Under Philip IV, the annual ordinary revenues of the French royal government totalled approximately 860,000 livres tournois, equivalent to 46 tonnes of silver. Overall revenues were about twice the ordinary revenues. Some 30% of the revenues were collected from the royal demesne. The royal financial administration employed perhaps 3,000 people, of which about 1,000 were officials in the proper sense. After assuming the throne, Philip inherited a sizable debt from his father's war against Aragon. By November 1286 it reached 8 tonnes of silver to his primary financiers, the Templars, equivalent to 17% of government revenue. This debt was quickly paid off, and, in 1287 and 1288, Philip's kingdom ran a budget surplus.

After 1289, a decline in Saxony's silver production, combined with Philip's wars against Aragon, England and Flanders, drove the French government to fiscal deficits. The war against Aragon, inherited from Philip's father, required the expenditure of 1.5 million LT (livres tournois) and the 1294–99 war against England over Gascony another 1.73 million LT. Loans from the Aragonese War were still being paid back in 1306.

To cover the deficit, Pope Nicholas IV in 1289 granted Philip permission to collect a tithe of 152,000 LP (livres parisis) from the Church lands in France. With revenues of 1.52 million LP, the church in France had greater fiscal resources than the royal government, whose ordinary revenues in 1289 amounted to 595,318 LP and overall revenues to 1.2 million LP. By November 1290, the deficit stood at 6% of revenues. In 1291 the budget swung back into surplus only to fall into deficit again in 1292.

The constant deficits led Philip to order the arrest of the Lombard merchants, who had earlier made him extensive loans on the pledge of repayment from future taxation. The Lombards' assets were seized by government agents and the crown extracted 250,000 LT by forcing the Lombards to purchase French nationality. Despite this draconian measure, the deficits continued to stack up in 1293. By 1295, Philip had replaced the Templars with the Florentine Franzesi bankers as his main source of finance. The Italians could raise huge loans far beyond the capacities of the Templars, and Philip came to rely on them more and more. The royal treasure was transferred from the Paris Temple to the Louvre around this time.

=== Devaluation ===
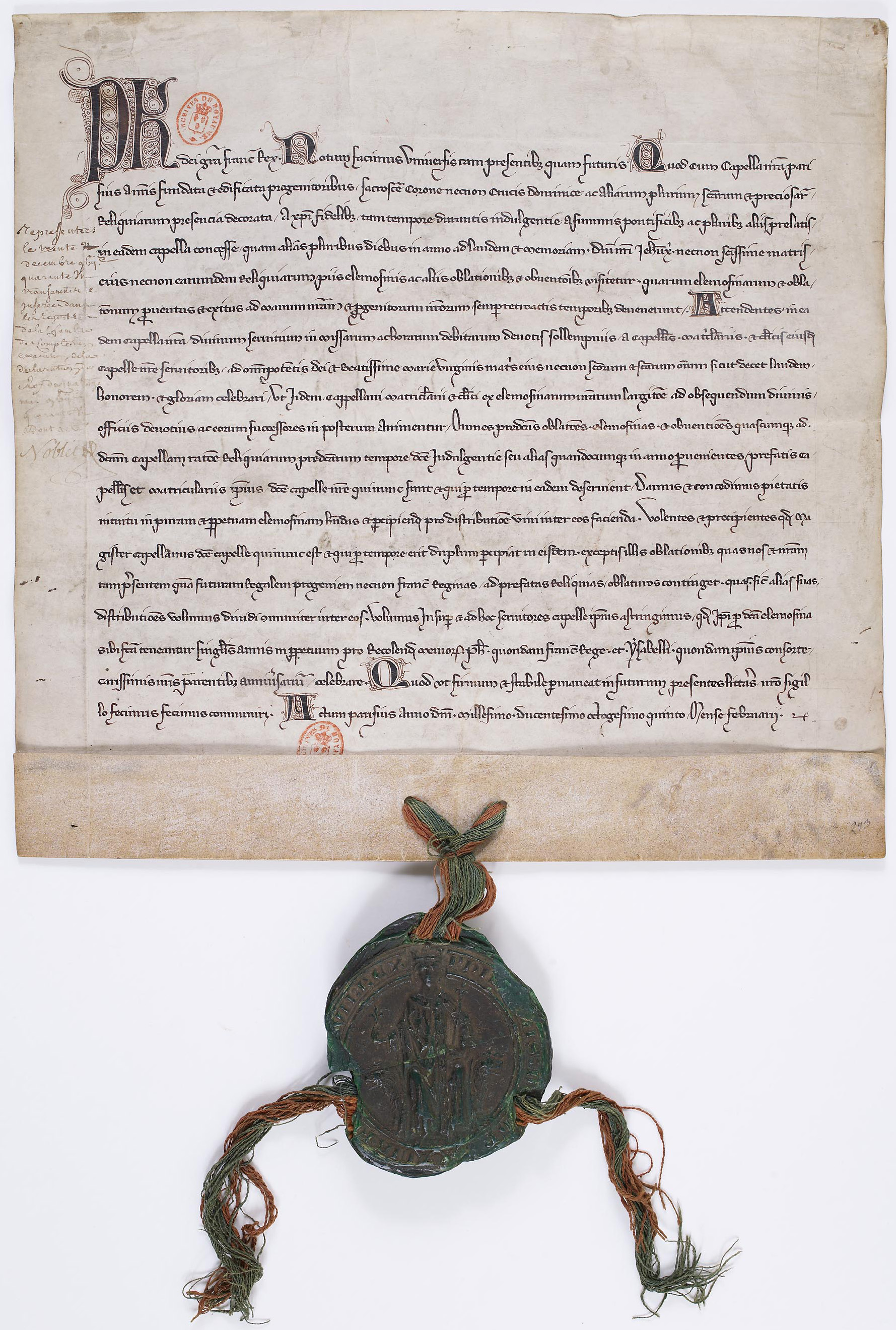
Donation made by the King of France, Philip IV the Fair, to the chaplains and wardens of the Sainte-Chapelle in Paris. February 1286

In 1294, France and England went to war and in 1297, the county of Flanders declared its independence from France. This conflict accelerated the financial problems incurred by the French monarch. As warfare continued and fiscal deficits persisted, Philip had no remedy but to use debasement of coinage as an alternative tool to meet his military expenditures. This measure made people wary of taking their coins to royal mints, preferring to take their silver abroad to exchange it for strong currencies, which by 1301 led to a dramatic disappearance of silver in France. Currency depreciation provided the crown with 1.419 million LP from November 1296 to Christmas 1299, more than enough to cover war costs of 1.066 million LP in the same period.

The resulting inflation damaged the real incomes of the creditors such as the aristocracy and the Church, who received a weaker currency in return for the loans they had issued in a stronger currency. The indebted lower classes did not benefit from the devaluation, as the high inflation ate into the purchasing power of their money. The result was social unrest. By 22 August 1303 this practice led to a two-thirds loss in the value of the livres, sous and deniers in circulation.

The defeat at the battle of Golden Spurs in 1302 was a crushing blow to French finance: the 15 months which followed this battle saw a depreciation of the currency by 37%, and new decrees were issued forbidding the export of gold and silver abroad. The royal government had to order officials and subjects to provide all or half, respectively, of their silver vessels for minting into coins. New taxes were levied to pay for the deficit. As people attempted to move their wealth out of the country in non-monetary form, Philip banned merchandise exports without royal approval. The king obtained another crusade tithe from the pope and returned the royal treasure to the Temple to gain the Templars as his creditors again.

Despite their consequences, these decisions were not considered immoral at that time, as they were the prince's accepted right, and this right could be taken far if a special situation, such as war, justified it. Furthermore, the issue of coins with a lower content of silver was needed to maintain circulation, in a context where the inflation of silver produced a severe scarcity of currency due to the ongoing commercial revolution.

=== Revaluation ===
After bringing the Flemish War to a victorious conclusion in 1305, Philip on 8 June 1306 ordered the silver content of new coinage to be raised back to its 1285 level of 3.96 grams of silver per livre. To harmonize the strength of the old and new currencies, the debased coinage of 1303 was devalued accordingly by two-thirds. The debtors were driven to penury by the need to repay their loans in the new, strong currency. This led to rioting in Paris on 30 December 1306, forcing Philip to briefly seek refuge in the Paris Temple, the headquarters of the Knights Templar.

Perhaps seeking to control the silver of the Jewish mints to put the revaluation to effect, Philip ordered the expulsion of the Jews on 22 July 1306 and confiscated their property on 23 August, collecting at least 140,000 LP with this measure. With the Jews gone, Philip appointed royal guardians to collect the loans made by the Jews, and the money was passed to the Crown. His son and successor, Louis X, invited Jews back in 1315 with an offer of 12 years under a strict charter.

When Philip levied taxes on the French clergy of one-half their annual income, he caused an uproar within the Catholic Church and the papacy, prompting Pope Boniface VIII to issue the bull Clericis Laicos (1296), forbidding the transference of any church property to the French Crown. Philip retaliated by forbidding the removal of bullion from France. By 1297, Boniface agreed to Philip's taxation of the clergy in emergencies.

In 1301, Philip had the bishop of Pamier arrested for treason. Boniface called French bishops to Rome to discuss Philip's actions. In response, Philip convoked an assembly of bishops, nobles and grand bourgeois of Paris in order to condemn the Pope. This precursor to the Estates General appeared for the first time during his reign, a measure of the professionalism and order that his ministers were introducing into government. This assembly, which was composed of clergy, nobles, and burghers, gave support to Philip.

Boniface retaliated with the famous bull Unam Sanctam (1302), a declaration of papal supremacy. Philip gained victory, after having sent his agent Guillaume de Nogaret to arrest Boniface at Anagni. The pope escaped but died soon afterward. The French archbishop Bertrand de Goth was elected pope as Clement V and thus began the so-called Babylonian Captivity of the papacy (1309–76), during which the papal court permanently moved to Avignon, an enclave surrounded by French territories, and was subjected to French control.

== Suppression of the Knights Templar ==
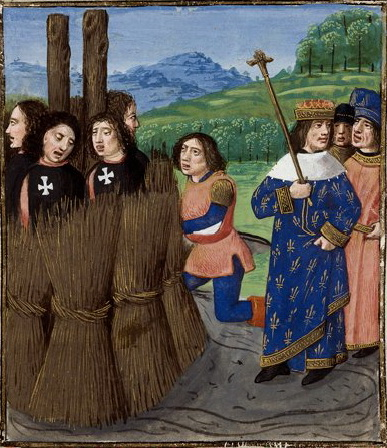
Templars burned at the stake. Painting made in 1480

Philip was substantially in debt to the Knights Templar, a monastic military order whose original role as protectors of Christian pilgrims in the Latin East had been largely replaced by banking and other commercial activities by the end of the 13th century. As the popularity of the Crusades had decreased, support for the military orders had waned, and Philip used a disgruntled complaint against the Knights Templar as an excuse to move against the entire organization as it existed in France, in part to free himself from his debts. Other motives appear to have included concern over perceived heresy, the assertion of French control over a weakened Papacy, and finally, the substitution of royal officials for officers of the Temple in the financial management of the French government.

At daybreak on Friday, 13 October 1307, hundreds of Templars in France were simultaneously arrested by agents of Philip the Fair, to be later tortured into admitting heresy in the Order. The Templars were subject only to the Pope, but Philip used his influence over Clement V, who was largely his pawn, to disband the organization. Pope Clement did attempt to hold proper trials, but Philip used the previously forced confessions to have many Templars burned at the stake before they could mount a proper defence.

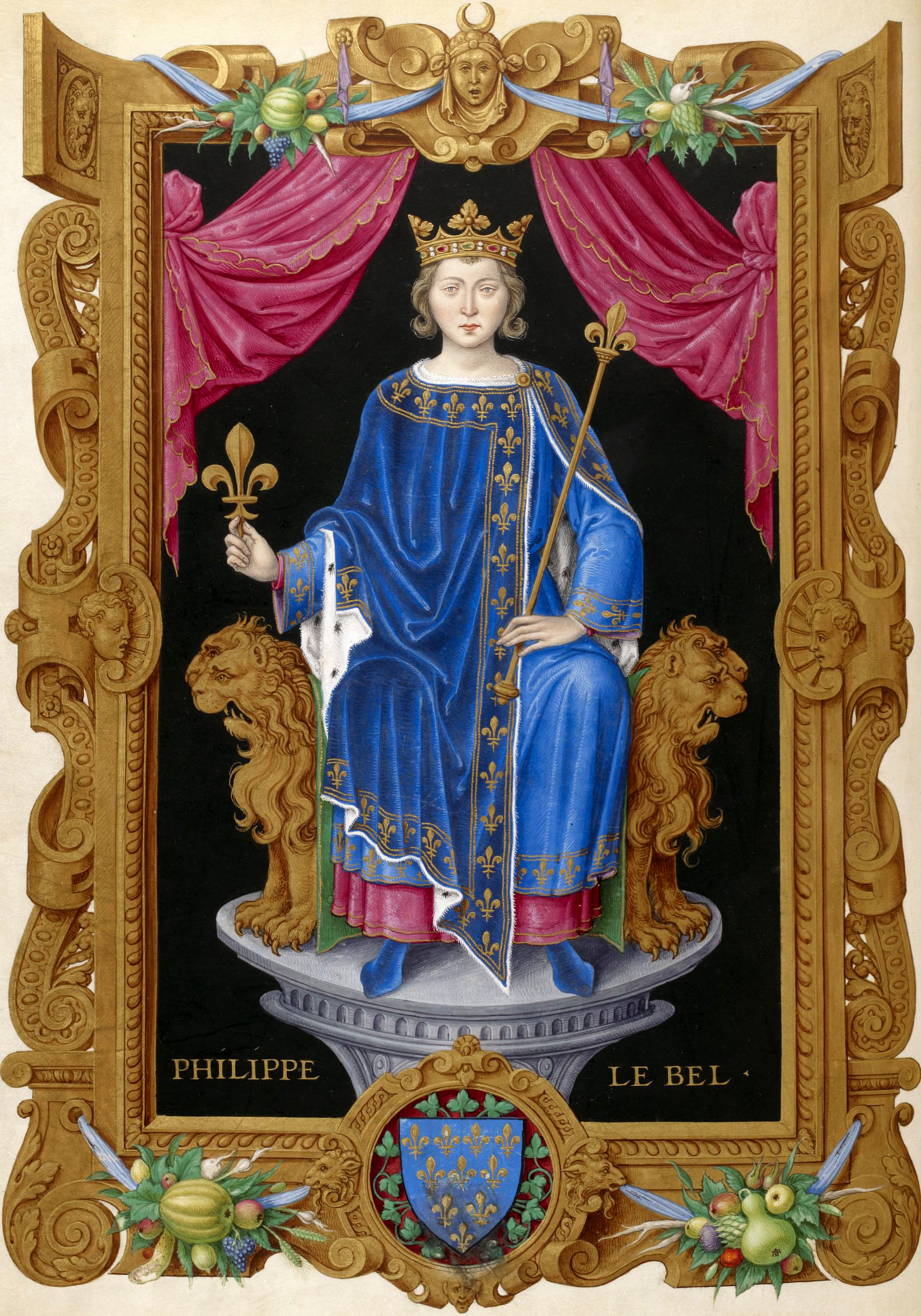
Philip IV the Fair from Recueil des rois de France, by Jean du Tillet, 1550

In March 1314, Philip had Jacques de Molay, the last Grand Master of the Temple, and Geoffroi de Charney, Preceptor of Normandy, burned at the stake. An account of the event goes as follows:

The cardinals dallied with their duty until March 1314, (exact day is disputed by scholars) when, on a scaffold in front of Notre Dame, Jacques de Molay, Templar Grand Master, Geoffroi de Charney, Master of Normandy, Hugues de Peraud, Visitor of France, and Godefroi de Gonneville, Master of Aquitaine, were brought forth from the jail in which for nearly seven years they had lain, to receive the sentence agreed upon by the cardinals, in conjunction with the Archbishop of Sens and some other prelates whom they had called in. Considering the offences, which the culprits had confessed and confirmed, the penance imposed was in accordance with rule – that of perpetual imprisonment. The affair was supposed to be concluded when, to the dismay of the prelates and wonderment of the assembled crowd, de Molay and Geoffroi de Charney arose. They had been guilty, they said, not of the crimes imputed to them, but of basely betraying their Order to save their own lives. It was pure and holy; the charges were fictitious and the confessions false. Hastily the cardinals delivered them to the Prevot of Paris, and retired to deliberate on this unexpected contingency, but they were saved all trouble. When the news was carried to Philippe he was furious. A short consultation with his council only was required. The canons pronounced that a relapsed heretic was to be burned without a hearing; the facts were notorious and no formal judgment by the papal commission need be waited for. That same day, by sunset, a stake was erected on a small island in the Seine, the Ile des Juifs, near the palace garden. There de Molay and de Charney were slowly burned to death, refusing all offers of pardon for retraction, and bearing their torment with a composure which won for them the reputation of martyrs among the people, who reverently collected their ashes as relics.

After a little over a month, Pope Clement V died of a disease thought to be lupus, and in eight months Philip IV, at the age of forty-six, died in a hunting accident. This gave rise to the legend that de Molay had cited them before the tribunal of God, which became popular among the French population. Even in Germany, Philip's death was spoken of as a retribution for his destruction of the Templars, and Clement was described as shedding tears of remorse on his deathbed for three great crimes, namely the poisoning of Henry VII, Holy Roman Emperor, and the ruin of the Templars and Beguines. Within fourteen years the throne passed rapidly through Philip's sons, who died relatively young, and without producing male heirs. By 1328, his male line was extinguished, and the throne had passed to the line of his brother, the House of Valois.

== Tour de Nesle affair ==
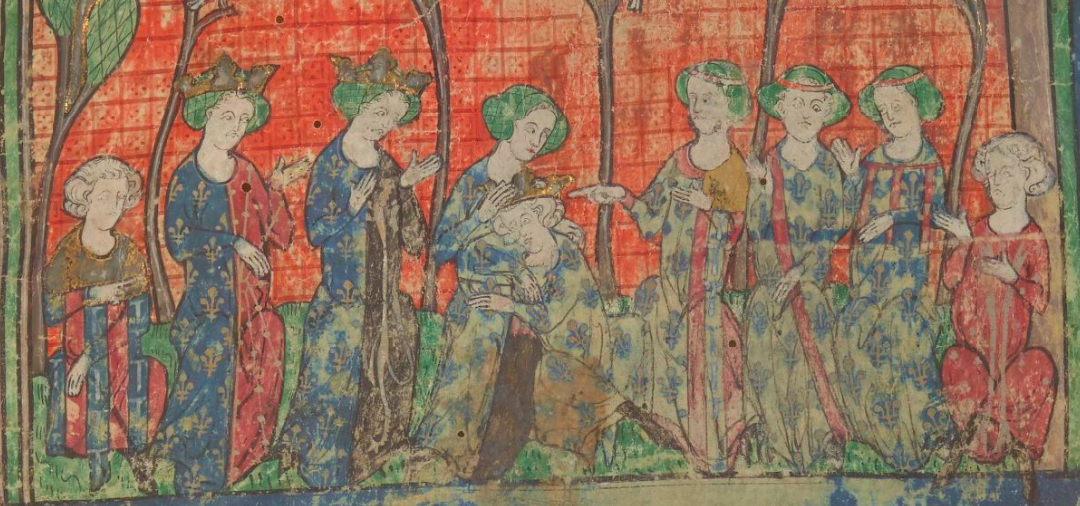
Relatives console Philip IV over the scandal

In 1314, the daughters-in-law of Philip IV, Margaret of Burgundy (wife of Louis X) and Blanche of Burgundy (wife of Charles IV) were accused of adultery and their alleged lovers (Phillipe d'Aunay and Gauthier d'Aunay) tortured, flayed and executed in what has come to be known as the Tour de Nesle affair (French: Affaire de la tour de Nesle). A third daughter-in-law, Joan II, Countess of Burgundy (wife of Philip V), was accused of knowledge of the affairs.

House of Capet during the 1314 Tour de Nesle affair succession crisis

Philip the Bold (1245–1285); Philip III, King of France r. 1270–1285
Joan of Navarre (1273–1305); Joan I, Queen of Navarre r. 1274–1305	Philip the Fair (1268–1314); Philip I, King of Navarre r. 1284–1305; Philip IV, King of France r. 1285–1314	Charles of Valois (1270–1325)
Louis the Quarreller (1289–1316); Louis I, King of Navarre r. 1305–1316; Louis X, King of France r. 1314–1316	Philip the Tall (1293–1322); Philip V, King of France r. 1316–1322; Philip II, King of Navarre r. 1316–1322	Charles the Fair; Charles the Bald (1294–1328); Charles IV, King of France r. 1322–1328; Charles I, King of Navarre r. 1322–1328	Isabella of France (c. 1295–1358)	Edward of Caernarfon (1284–1327); Edward II, King of England	Philip the Fortunate; Philip of Valois (1293–1350); Philip VI, King of France r. 1328–1350
John the Posthumous (1316); John I, King of France; John I, King of Navarre r. 1316	Joan of Navarre (1312–1349); Joan II, Queen of Navarre r. 1328–1349	Joan III (1308–1347); Countess of Burgundy	Edward of Windsor (1312–1377); Edward III, King of England	John the Good (1319–1364); John II, King of France r. 1350–1364
Charles the Bad (1332–1387); Charles II, King of Navarre r. 1349–1387	Joan of Valois (1343–1373)	Charles the Wise (1338–1380); Charles V, King of France r. 1364–1380

== Death ==
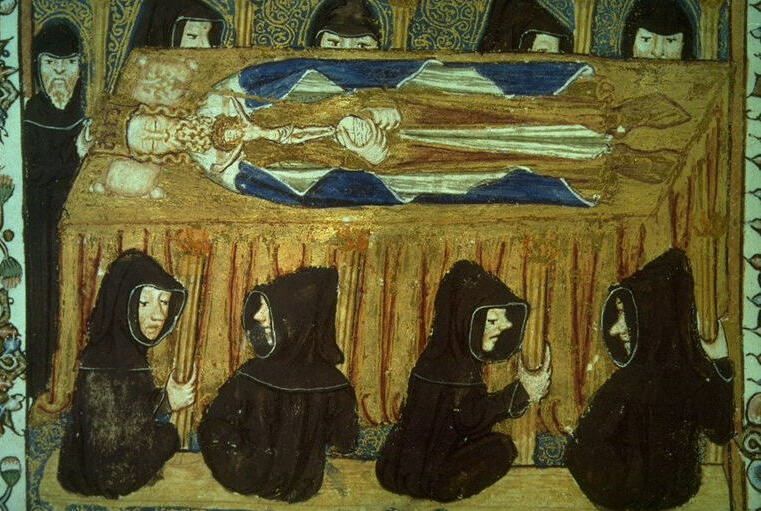
Philip's body lying in state

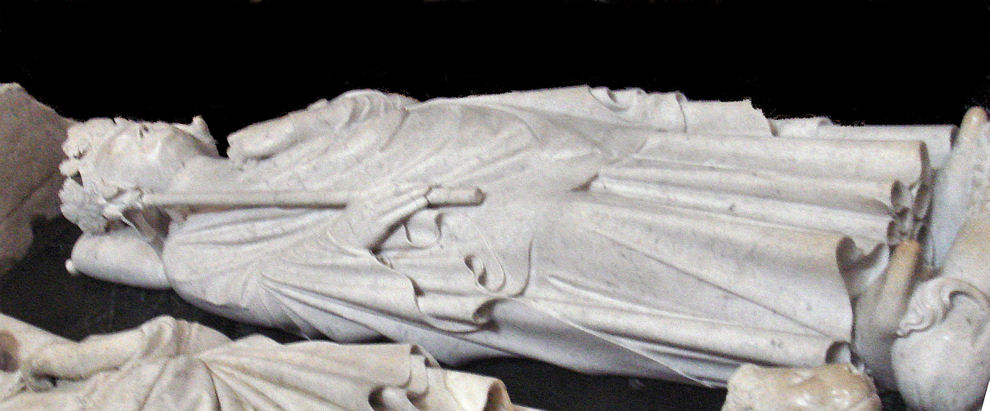
Tomb of Philip IV in the Basilica of Saint-Denis

Philip had a cerebral stroke during a hunt at Pont-Sainte-Maxence (Forest of Halatte), and died a few weeks later, on 29 November 1314, at Fontainebleau. (Note: Bradbury states Philip fell from his horse, broke his leg which became infected, and died, 29 November 1314.) He is buried in the Basilica of Saint-Denis. Philip was succeeded by his son Louis X.

== Issue ==
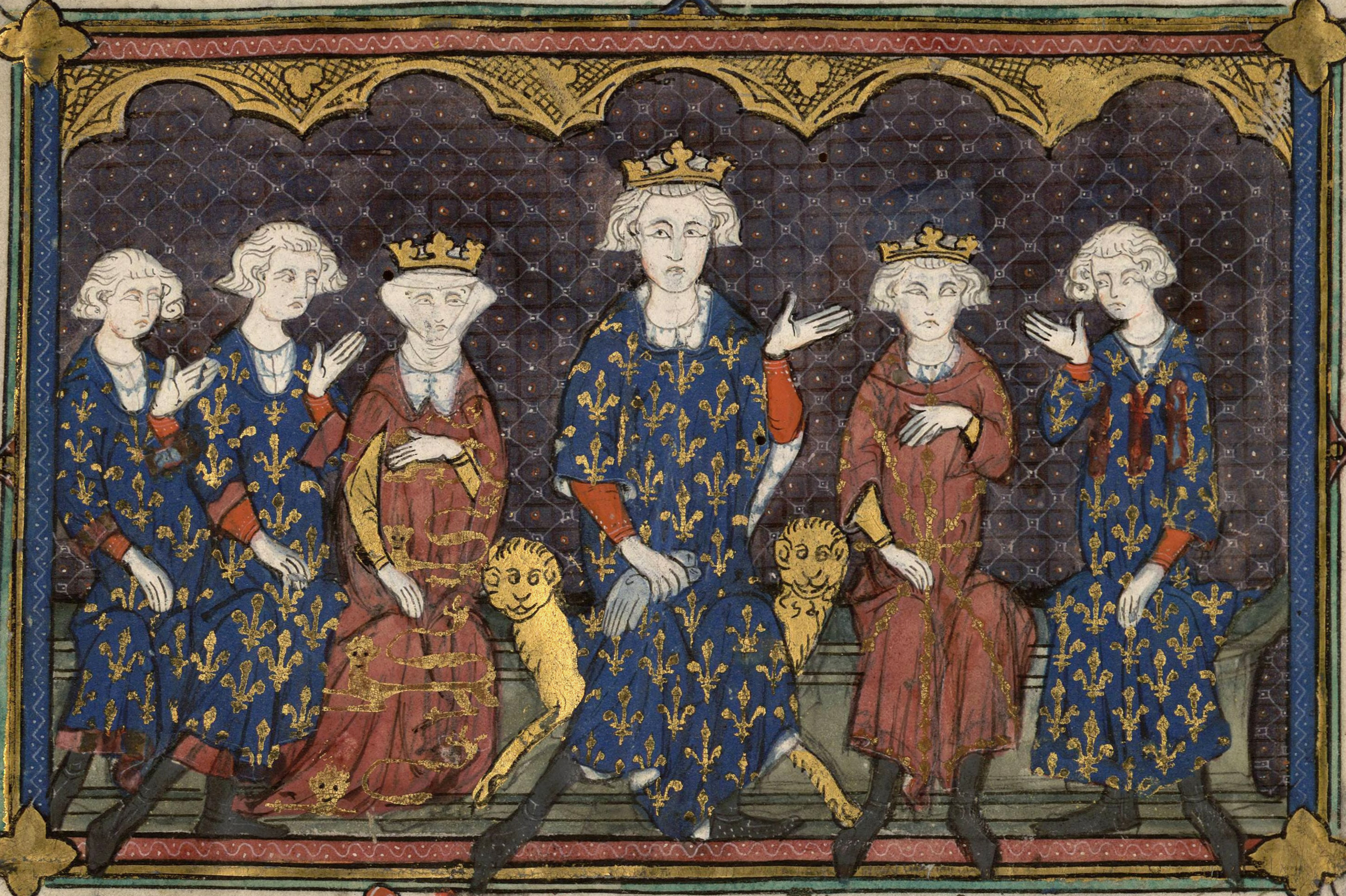
The King's family, depicted in 1315: L-R: Philip IV's children, Charles, Philip and Isabella, Philip IV himself, his heir Louis, and his brother, Charles of Valois. Bibliothèque nationale de France

The children of Philip IV of France and Joan I of Navarre were:

1. Margaret (c. 1288, Paris – d. 1300, Paris). Died in childhood, betrothed to Infante Ferdinand of Castile
2. Louis X (4 October 1289 – 5 June 1316)
3. Blanche (1290, Paris – after 13 April 1294, Saint Denis). Died in childhood, but betrothed in December 1291 (aged one) to Infante Ferdinand of Castile, later Ferdinand IV of Castile. Blanche was buried in the Basilica of St Denis.
4. Philip V (c. 1291 – 3 January 1322)
5. Charles IV (1294 – 1 February 1328)
6. Isabella (c. 1295 – 23 August 1358). Married Edward II of England and was the mother of Edward III of England.
7. Robert (1296, Paris – August 1308, Saint Germain-en-Laye). The Flores historiarum of Bernard Guidonis names "Robertum" as youngest of the four sons of Philip IV of France, adding that he died "in flore adolescentiæ suæ" ("in the flower of youth") and was buried "in monasterio sororum de Pyssiaco" ("in the monastery of the Sisters of Pyssiaco") in August 1308. Betrothed in October 1306 (aged ten) to Constance of Sicily.

All three of Philip's sons who reached adulthood became kings of France and Navarre, and Isabella, his only surviving daughter, was the queen of England as consort to Edward II.

== In fiction ==
Dante Alighieri often refers to Philip in La Divina Commedia, never by name but as the "mal di Francia" (plague of France). It is possible that Dante hides further the person of the king behind 7 figures: Cerbero, Pluto, Filippo Argenti (Philippe de l'argent), Capaneo, Gerione, Nembrot, in the Inferno, and the Giant in the Purgatorio killed by the "515". These representations are centred around Capaneo, referring to the myth of the Seven against Thebes, and are related to the Beast from the Sea in the Revelation of St. John, whose seventh head, like the Giant, is also killed. Such a scheme is related to the transposition of the Revelation in history, according to the ideas of Joachim of Fiore.

Philip is the title character in Le Roi de fer (1955), translated as The Iron King, the first novel in Les Rois maudits (The Accursed Kings), a series of French historical novels by Maurice Druon. The next six entries in the series follow the descendants of Philip, including both his sons Louis X and Philip V and his daughter Isabella of France. He was portrayed by Georges Marchal in the 1972 French miniseries adaptation of the series, and by Tchéky Karyo in the 2005 adaptation. In late 2024, newly formed distribution company Yapluka announced that they are developing a new adaptation of the novels for film as their first project. The Iron King is planned to start production in 2027.

The court of Philip IV of France and Philip himself attended the execution of Jacques de Molay in Assassin's Creed Unity. In the television series Knightfall (2017), Philip is portrayed by Ed Stoppard.

== Sources ==
- Barber, Malcolm (2012). The Trial of the Templars. Cambridge University Press. ISBN 978-0-521-45727-9.
- Black, Antony (1982). Political Thought in Europe, 1250–1450. Cambridge University Press.
- Bradbury, Jim (2007). The Capetians: Kings of France 987–1328. London: Hambledon Continuum. ISBN 978-1-85285-528-4.
- Brown, E. (1987). "The Prince is Father of the King: The Character and Childhood of Philip the Fair of France". Mediaeval Studies. 49: 282–334. doi:10.1484/J.MS.2.306887. eISSN 2507-0436. ISSN 0076-5872.
- Chazan, Robert (1979). Church, State, and Jew in the Middle Ages. Behrman House.
- Contamine, Philippe; Kerhervé, Jean; Rigaudière, Albert (2007). Monnaie, fiscalité et finances au temps de Philippe Le Bel: journée d'études du 14 mai 2004. Comité pour l'histoire économique et financière de la France.
- Curveiller, Stephane (1989). Dunkerque, ville et port de Flandre à la fin du Moyen âge: à travers les comptes de bailliage de 1358 à 1407 (in French). Presses Univ. Septentrion. ISBN 978-2-85939-361-8.
- De Donder, Vic (2007). In de naam van Vlaanderen. Een historie (8ste - 21ste eeuw) [In Flanders' name. A history (8th-21st century)] (in Dutch). Leuven: Davidsfonds. ISBN 9789058264985.
- Field, Sean L. (2019). Courting Sanctity: Holy Women and the Capetians. Cornell University Press. ISBN 978-1-50173-619-3.
- Grummitt, David & Lassalmonie, Jean-François (2015). "Royal public finance (c. 1290–1523)". In Christopher Fletcher; Jean-Philippe Genet & John Watts (eds.). Government and Political Life in England and France, c. 1300–c. 1500. Cambridge University Press. pp. 116–. ISBN 978-1-107-08990-7.
- Hellinga, Gerben Graddesz (2013). Graven Van Vlaanderen [Counts Of Flanders] (in Dutch). Zutphen: Walburg pers. ISBN 9789057309250.
- Henneman, John Bell (2015). Royal Taxation in Fourteenth-Century France: The Development of War Financing, 1322–1359. Princeton University Press.
- Keen, Maurice Hugh (2003). England in the Later Middle Ages: A Political History. Psychology Press. ISBN 9780415272926.
- Lerner, Robert E. (1968). The Age of Adversity: The Fourteenth Century. Cornell University Press.
- Mostaert, Antoine; Cleaves, Francis Woodman (1962). Les Lettres de 1289 et 1305 des ilkhan Arγun et Ölǰeitü à Philippe le Bel. Harvard University Press.
- Ozment, Steven (1980). The Age of Reform, 1250–1550: An Intellectual and Religious History of Late Medieval and Reformation Europe. Yale University Press.
- Prestwich, Michael (1988). Edward I, English monarchs. University of California Press. ISBN 9780520062665.
- Jostkleigrewe, Georg (2018). Pleszczynski, Andrzej; Sobiesiak, Joanna; Tomaszek, Michal; Tyszka, Przemyslaw (eds.). Imagined Communities: Constructing Collective Identities in Medieval Europe. Vol. 8. Brill.
- Richard, Jean (1996). Histoire des croisades (in French). Fayard. ISBN 978-2-213-59787-4.
- Strayer, Joseph (1980). The Reign of Philip the Fair. Princeton: Princeton University Press. ISBN 978-0-691-10089-0.
- Taylor, Craig, ed. (2006). Debating the Hundred Years War. Vol. 29. Cambridge University Press.
- Torre, Ignacio de la (2010). "The Monetary Fluctuations in Philip IV's Kingdom of France and Their Relevance to the Arrest of the Templars". In Jochen Burgtorf; Paul F. Crawford & Helen Nicholson (eds.). The Debate on the Trial of the Templars (1307–1314). Farnham: Ashgate. pp. 57–68. ISBN 978-0-7546-6570-0.
- Street, John C. (1963). "Les Lettres de 1289 et 1305 des ilkhan Arγun et Ölǰeitü à Philippe le Bel by Antoine Mostaert, Francis Woodman Cleaves". Journal of the American Oriental Society (book review). 83 (2): 265–268. doi:10.2307/598384. JSTOR 598384.
- Trio, Paul; Heirbaut, Dirk; van den Auweele, Dirk (2002). Omtrent 1302 [About 1302] (in Dutch). Leuven: Universitaire Pers Leuven. ISBN 9058672085.
- Tucker, Spencer C. (2010). A Global Chronology of Conflict. Vol. 1. ABC-CLIO.
- Warner, Kathryn (2016). Isabella of France, The Rebel Queen. Amberley.
- Wolfe, Michael (2009). Walled Towns and the Shaping of France: From the Medieval to the Early Modern Era. Palgrave Macmillan.
- Woodacre, Elena (2013). The Queens Regnant of Navarre. Palgrave Macmillan.

Philip IV of France House of Capet Born: 1268 Died: 29 November 1314
Regnal titles
Preceded by Philip III	King of France; 1285–1314	Succeeded by Louis X and I
Preceded by Joan I as sole ruler	King of Navarre; Count of Champagne; 1284–1305; With: Joan I	Succeeded by Louis X and I
