= Hôtel de Ville, Noyon =

Town hall in Noyon, France

Hôtel de Ville
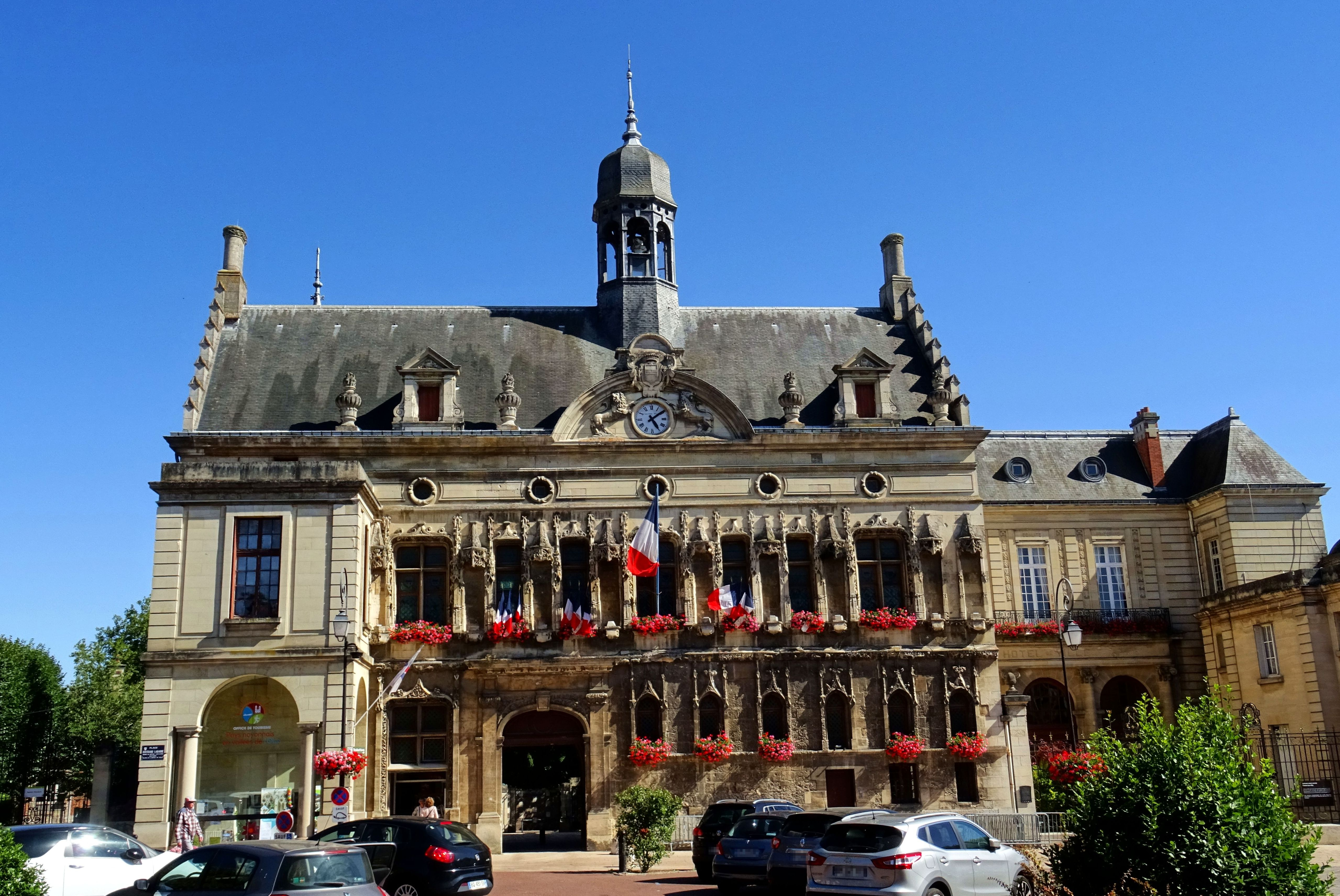
- The main frontage of the Hôtel de Ville in July 2020

General information
- Type: City hall
- Architectural style: Gothic style
- Location: Noyon, France
- Coordinates: 49.5803°N 3.0005°E
- Completed: 1520

Design and construction
- Architect: Matthieu Réaulme

Monument historique
- Official name: Hôtel de ville
- Type: Inscrit
- Designated: 2004
- Reference no.: PA60000019

The Hôtel de Ville (French pronunciation: [otɛl də vil], City Hall) is a municipal building in Noyon, Oise, northern France, standing on Place Bertrand Lebarre. It was designated a monument historique by the French government in 2004.

== History ==
The first municipal building in the town dated back at least to the 13th century. It was rebuilt several times but, by 1480, it was very dilapidated and the civil leaders decided to demolish it and to commission a new building on the same site. The new building was designed by Matthieu Réaulme in the Gothic style, built in ashlar stone and was completed in 1520.

The design involved an asymmetrical main frontage of seven bays facing onto what is now Place Bertrand Lebarre. The second bay on the left featured an oval-headed opening flanked by pilasters supporting an entablature and a cornice. The bay to the left was fenestrated by a mullioned window, while the bays to the right were fenestrated by small arched windows. The first floor was fenestrated by seven mullioned windows separated by nine niches. The niches probably accommodated statues of Hector, Alexander the Great, Julius Caesar, Joshua, David, Judas Maccabeus, King Arthur, Charlemagne and Godfrey of Bouillon. At roof level, there was an entablature punctuated by five oculi, a frieze, a cornice and a semi-circular pediment containing a clock. There was also an octagonal turret.

The building was badly damaged during the Spanish invasion of 1552, part of the Habsburg-Valois War, and was restored in 1567. During the French Revolution, the revolutionaries tore down a fleur-de-lis from the turret. The building was badly damaged by the occupying German troops, who started a fire there on the night of 26 May 1918, during the German spring offensive, part of the First World War. A ceremony was held in front of the shattered town hall on 11 July 1920, at which Marshal Joseph Joffre presented the Legion of Honour to representatives of the town council. This event was later depicted in a painting which was hung inside the building. An extensive programme of restoration works, involving a new concrete frame to support the walls, was completed to a design by André Collin on 30 October 1935.

A fine manuscript, known as the Évangéliaire de Morienval (the Morienval Gospel Book), which was produced at Hautvillers Abbey in the 9th century, was acquired in the late 19th century, and subsequently placed on display in the library. A plaster cast of a statue depicting the sculptor, Jacques Sarazin, was created in the mid-20th century and placed in the vestibule of the town hall.
