= Sauvaire Intermet =

French composer

Sauvaire Intermet (ca. 1573 – 1657 in Avignon) was a 17th-century French musician and composer.

== Biography ==
Originally from Tarascon, Sauvaire is perhaps the son of Giraud Antermet who was baptized on 30 November 1573 in the Sainte-Marthe church of Tarascon. He was appointed a clerk.

In 1590, Sauvaire Intermet was appointed music master of the Church of St. Trophime, Arles until 1595, when he seems to have moved to Avignon where he was already benefiting from the chapter of Saint-Agricol.

An act of 25 March 1599 qualifies him as mestre de chapelle de la Reyne de France, probably Louise de Lorraine-Vaudemont (1553-1601), widow of Henri III and retired at Chenonceaux. He was able at that time to meet masters of the Chapel or the King's Chamber. On 24 August 1599, he was received canon in the chapter of Saint-Agricol of Avignon and took on the role of Kapellmeister. His career in this church lasted several decades; it was punctuated with the classic incidents of a master's life, such as a procedure for insults uttered against the master of children in 1612. On 1 May 1619 he became auditor of the accounts of the chapter of Saint-Agricol, which obliged him to be replaced.

His career at Saint-Agricol suffered some interruptions at Saint-Just de Narbonne in 1613-1614 and around 1616, then at Saint-Sauveur of Aix-en-Provence from March to August 1629 (he was rehired on 28 August in Avignon). After his return from Aix-en-Provence in 1629 he returned to Avignon as a music master, and on 30 October 1629 as an auditor of the accounts.

In addition to these engagements, Intermet was at the disposal of the City for royal entrances and other major events. For a musician, the city of Avignon was a choice position, situated in the pontifical possessions and thus subject to Italian influences. The Jesuits were very present there, with a novitiate and an important college which was greatly strengthened during the prohibition of the order in France between the end of 1594 and 1603. Avignon was in fact an advanced position of pontifical influence in France and a Jesuit stronghold surrounded by lands dominated by Protestantism. Here, Intermet was Kapellmeister, and official musician of the city and county of Avignon, in charge of the musical animation of ceremonies and royal entrances, and probably also master of music at the Jesuit College. This triple status had given him a significant preeminence over the other Avignon musicians, if not Provençal, since he settled there for a period of about fifty years, particularly long for a chapel master.

Archival records show him adding a band of violins to his singers to reinforce the music during solemn celebrations or major processions. Several relations mention him as the leader of the music during major celebrations, as in November 1600 at the entrance of Marie de Médicis for which he gathered the singers of all the chapels of Avignon, or at the end of July 1622 during the feasts of the canonization of Ignatius of Loyola and François Xavier. He also intervened in November 1622 at the entrance of Louis XIII in Avignon (the king had a copy of Intermet's music made, so delighted he was).

Intermet was also active for the brotherhoods of craftsmen or penitents, often located in the chapel of the Jesuit College. He was asked to direct their services in music or to compose hymns for them, as evidenced by a document from 1647 concerning the congregation of taffeta craftsmen. In Avignon, he had to be in contact with a few characters who were now more famous than he was: the Jesuit Athanasius Kircher (1602–1680), the master musician Annibal Gantez (c. 1600–1668), or Nicolas Saboly (1614–1675), famous composers of carols.

Intermet made a first will on 3 January 1625, when he was ill. He planned on this occasion an annual mass of the dead and some donations. A new will was made on 8 February 1645, which provided for his burial in Avignon or Tarascon according to the place where he died. Finally, he appointed his nephew Michel Intermet as his executor and died shortly after 16 October 1657, aged 84. François Béraud, organist at Saint-Agricol since 1654, succeeded Intermet as music master.

== Works ==
His work is mostly lost or fragmented and therefore difficult to appreciate.

=== Songs ===
- 4 songs in French, 4 v. in Ms. Bayle, c. 1597 (lost, mentioned by Gastoué 1904).

=== Carols and canticles ===
- Canticles pour l'entrée de Marie de Médicis, 1600.
- Là ça qui veut voir un dieu enfant 4v ? Chicago NL : Case MS 5136
- Quand l'œil de Jesus je voy 4-8v Chicago NL : Case MS 5136
- Noëls 2v, anonymous and partly by Intermet, Avignon Ms. 1250 and Ms. 1181, copied ca. 1653-1664.
- Cantiques spirituels à l'usage de la Congrégation des jeunes artisans érigée à Avignon (Lyon : Antoine Molin, 1653 (music printed by Robert III Ballard), lost.
- Intermet may have contributed to music adapted to the Hymnes et cantiques by Michel Coyssard (Antwerpen, 1600, and Paris, 1623/1655).

=== Masses ===
- Missa pro defunctis, 1613, lost, mentioned by Robert 1966 (p. 628).
- Missa pour les Minimes, lost, mentioned in 1965.
- Missa 8 v In devotione, lost.
- Missa 6 v, lost, both mentioned by Dufourcq 1958.

=== Motets ===
Most of his known motets are preserved in five separate parts, remnants of a set of twelve, recently discovered in the H. M. Brown Collection in Chicago, to which can be added an isolated part from another collection of the same origin. These motets are written on various psalms, hymns, prayers, repons, versets and antiphons.

Among the latter, most concern the liturgy on Fridays and Holy Saturdays. For the rest, the centonisation process is widely used, with verses extracted from, among other things, the following verses John 6, Isaiah, and Ecclesiastes. This collection contains seven motets to the praise of great Jesuit figures: Ignatius Loyola, François Xavier and François Borgia.

The dates found in this collection mention the years 1622, 1623 and 1624; it is therefore obvious that a part of these motets could have been composed for the feasts of the joint canonization of saints Ignatius Loyola and François Xavier, in 1622, as with those of the beatification of Francis Borgia in November 1624 (and we know from the testimonies above that Intermet took an active part in their celebration).

The music is of a contrapuntal style, quite varied, with sometimes very homophonic sections, in the style of fauxbourdon or "simple counterpoint".

This collection also contains evidence of the polychoral practice already described in the testimonies of 1600 and 1622: writing with two or three choirs, the early appearance of small soloists' choirs in opposition to the large choir, and sometimes a refrain-couplet structure that lends itself naturally to spatialization. It provides a unique testimony to the music that could be performed at Jesuit celebrations in Avignon in the early 17th century.

Known motets by Sauvaire Intermet

- Accepit Jesus calicem 6 v, lost
- Adeste filii confortamini 5v Chicago NL: Case MS 5136
- Attendite popule meus 8v, 1622, Chicago NL: Case MS 5136
- Ave virgo gloriosa Chicago NL: MS 5123
- Caligaverunt 4v, Avignon BM: Ms. 1250
- Cantate Domino filii Dei 8v, 1623, Chicago NL: Case MS 5136
- Crux fidelis inter omnes 6v, Chicago NL: Case MS 5136
- Dilectus Deo et hominibus 8v, 1623, Chicago NL: Case MS 5136
- Dixit Dominus Domino meo, 4v, 1623, Chicago NL: Case MS 5136
- Ecce tu pulchram anima mea Chicago NL: MS 5123
- Exultate et resonum 4v, Chicago NL: Case MS 5136
- Exultate et resonum 8v, Chicago NL: Case MS 5136
- Exultate et resonum 12v, Chicago NL: Case MS 5136
- Filia Jerusalem 4v, Chicago NL: Case MS 5136 + MS 5123
- Filiae Hierusalem, lost
- Heu moritur Christus 8v, 1624, Chicago NL: Case MS 5136
- Hic est panis angelicus 4v, Chicago NL: Case MS 5136
- Hic est panis angelicus 8v, Aosta, Bibl. Capitolare: Mus. Cartella 7, f. 72 (T1 seul)
- Ignatius quasi oliva pullulans 8v, Chicago NL: Case MS 5136
- In monte oliveti, 4v, Avignon BM: Ms. 1250
- In supremæ nocte, 4v, Avignon BM: Ms. 1250
- Laudate dominum omnes gentes 6v, lost
- Laudate pueri Dominum, 8v voci pari, 1624, Chicago NL: Case MS 5136
- Magnum haereditatis 5v, Chicago NL: Case MS 5136
- Memoria Borgiae in compositione 8v, Chicago NL: Case MS 5136
- O crux laudabilis 8v ? Chicago NL: Case MS 5136
- O panis candidissime 6v, Chicago NL: Case MS 5136
- O sacrum convivium 6v, lost
- O vos omnes 6v, Chicago NL: Case MS 5136
- Obstupescite et admiramini 8v, 1623, Chicago NL: Case MS 5136
- Omnes sitientes venite 8v, 1624, Chicago NL: Case MS 5136
- Pange lingua 4v, Avignon BM: Ms. 1250
- Panis angelicus, fit panis hominum, 4v. Chicago NL: Case MS 5136
- Popule meus 6v, Chicago NL: Case MS 5136
- Replete nos gaudio salutari 5-5v ? Chicago NL : MS 5123
- Rex angelorum paravit, 4v, Avignon BM: Ms. 1250
- Sacra christi caro 8v, Chicago NL: Case MS 5136
- Soror nostra es crescas 8v, Chicago NL: Case MS 5136
- Stabat mater dolorosa 6v, Chicago NL: Case MS 5136
- Tantum ergo 4v, Avignon BM: Ms. 1250
- Vade ad gentem convulsam 8v, Chicago NL: Case MS 5136
- Veni creator spiritus, 8v, Chicago NL: Case MS 5136
- Vide Domine afflictionem meam 4v, Chicago NL: Case MS 5136
- Videntes te Christe 4v, Chicago NL: Case MS 5136

== Reception ==
Intermet's fame was great, and all the more significant since after 1600 he never seems to have left his native Provence and his works were almost never printed. Annibal Gantez quoted him in 1643 as equal to Eustache Du Caurroy and Claude le Jeune; the Jesuit Antoine Parran also quoted him in his Traité de musique in 1639.

== Bibliography ==
- Giorgio Chatrian, Il fondo musicale della biblioteca capitolare di Aosta. Torino : Centro Studi Piemontesi, 1985.
- Norbert Dufourcq, "Un inventaire de la musique religieuse de la Collégiale Notre-Dame d'Annecy, 1661", Revue de musicologie 41 (1958), (pp. 38-59).
- Henri-André Durand, "Les instruments dans la musique sacrée au chapitre collégial Saint-Agricol d'Avignon", Revue de Musicologie 52/1 (1966) (pp. 73-87).
- Amédée Gastoué, "La musique à Avignon et dans le Comtat du XIVe au XVIIIe siècle", Rivista musicale italiana 11 (1904) (pp. 268-29141), 554-578, 768-777. Reprint in La vie musicale dans les provinces françaises, IV (1980) (pp. 179-237).
- Laurent Guillo, "Un recueil de motets de Sauvaire Intermet (Avignon, ca. 1620-1625): Chicago, Newberry Library, Case MS 5136", XVIIe siècle, 232 (July 2006) (pp. 453-475).
- Laurent Guillo, "Pierre I Ballard et Robert III Ballard, imprimeurs du roy pour la musique (1599-1673)". – Sprimont et Versailles: 2003. 2 vol. Supplément en ligne sur le site du CMBV (Cahiers Philidor 33).
- Denise Launay, "Les motets à double chœur en France dans la première moitié du XVIIe siècle", Revue de musicologie, 40 (1957) (pp. 173-195).
- Margaret M. McGowan, "Les Jésuites à Avignon : les fêtes au service de la propagande politique et religieuse", Les Fêtes de la Renaissance III : actes du Quinzième colloque international d'études humanistes (Tours, 10-22 July 1972). (Paris: 1975), (pp. 153-171).
- Joseph d'Ortigue, "La Musique à l'église". - Paris: Didier, 1861.
- Félix Raugel, "La maîtrise et les orgues de la Primatiale Saint-Trophime d'Arles", Recherches sur la musique classique française 2 (1962), P• 102.
- Jean Robert, "Maîtres de chapelle à Avignon, 1610-1675", Revue de musicologie 51/2 (1965), (pp. 149-169).
- Jean Robert, "La maîtrise Saint-Agricol d'Avignon au XVIIe siècle", Actes du 90e Congrès national des sociétés savantes (Nice, 1965), Section d’histoire moderne et contemporaine, 3: De la Restauration à nos jours, histoire de l’art, Paris, 1966, (pp. 609-635).
