= Pierre Berault =

French grammarian

Pierre Berault was a 17th-century French grammarian. A Jesuit, Berault converted to Protestantism in 1671 and subsequently taught French in England.

== Works ==
- The Church of Rome evidently proved heretick, 1781
- A New, plain, short and compleat French and English grammar, 1688
- Logick, or, The key of sciences, and the Moral science, or, The way to be happy, 1690
