= Noyon =

Commune in Hauts-de-France, France

Noyon Noéyon (Picard)
- Commune
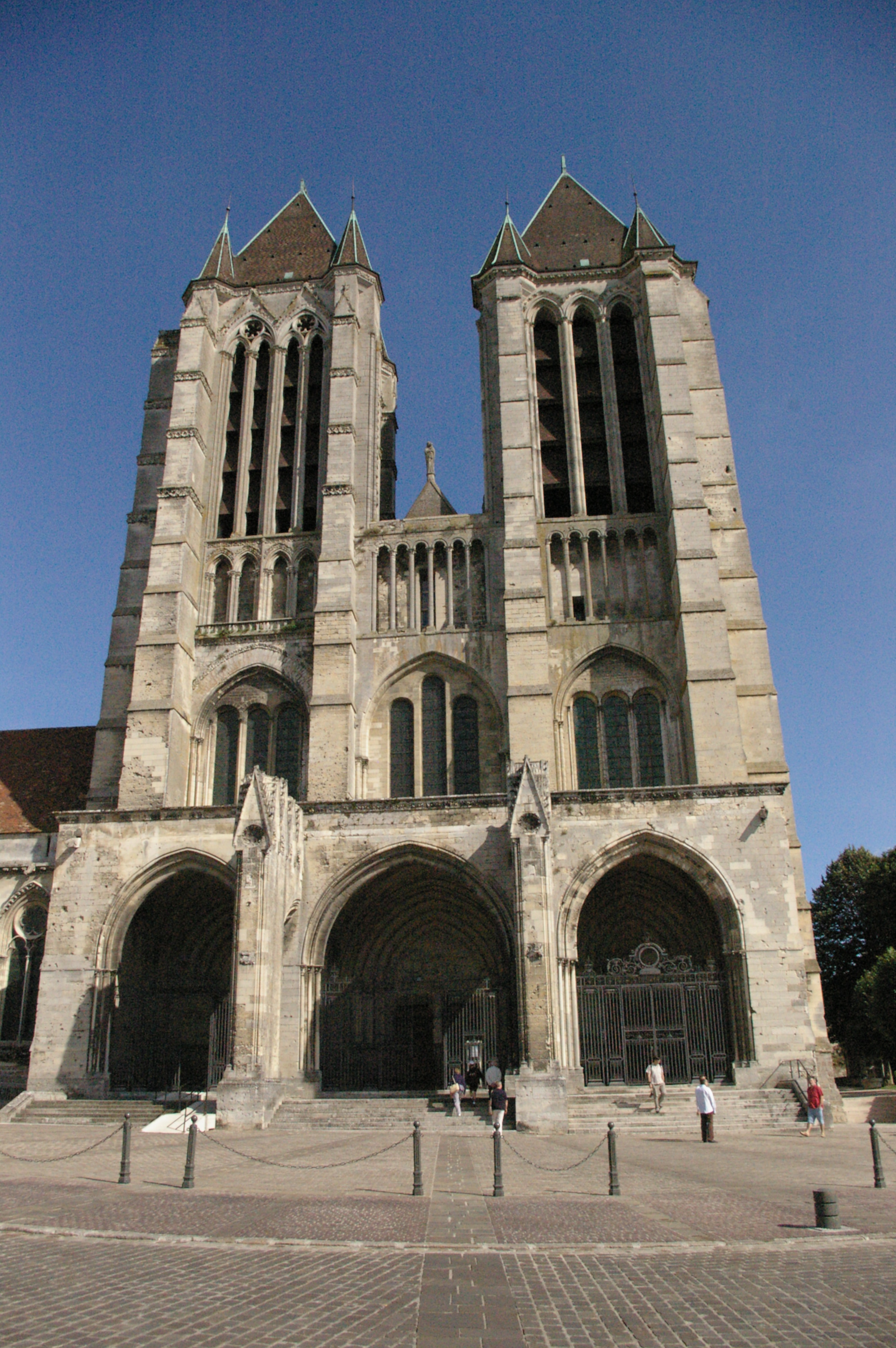
- Noyon Cathedral

- Flag Coat of arms
- Location of Noyon
- Location within France Location within Hauts-de-France
- Coordinates: 49°34′54″N 2°59′59″E
- Country: France
- Region: Hauts-de-France
- Department: Oise
- Arrondissement: Compiègne
- Canton: Noyon
- Intercommunality: Pays Noyonnais

Government
  - Mayor (2021–2026): Sandrine Dauchelle
- Area^{1}: 18 km^{2} (6.9 sq mi)
- Elevation: 52 m (171 ft)
- Highest elevation: 153 m (502 ft)
- Lowest elevation: 36 m (118 ft)
- Population (2023): 12,971
  - Density: 720/km^{2} (1,900/sq mi)
- Time zone: UTC+01:00 (CET)
  - Summer (DST): UTC+02:00 (CEST)
- INSEE/Postal code: 60471 /60400
- Website: www.ville-noyon.fr
- ^{1} French Land Register data, which excludes lakes, ponds, glaciers > 1 km^{2} (0.386 sq mi or 247 acres) and river estuaries.

Noyon (French pronunciation: [nwajɔ̃]; Picard: Noéyon; Latin: Noviomagus Veromanduorum, Noviomagus of the Veromandui, then Noviomum) is a commune in the Oise department of Upper France.

== Geography ==
Noyon lies on the river Oise, about 109 kilometres (68 mi) northeast of Paris. The Oise Canal and the Canal du Nord pass through the commune. Noyon station is served by regional trains to Creil, Saint-Quentin, Compiègne and Paris.

== History ==
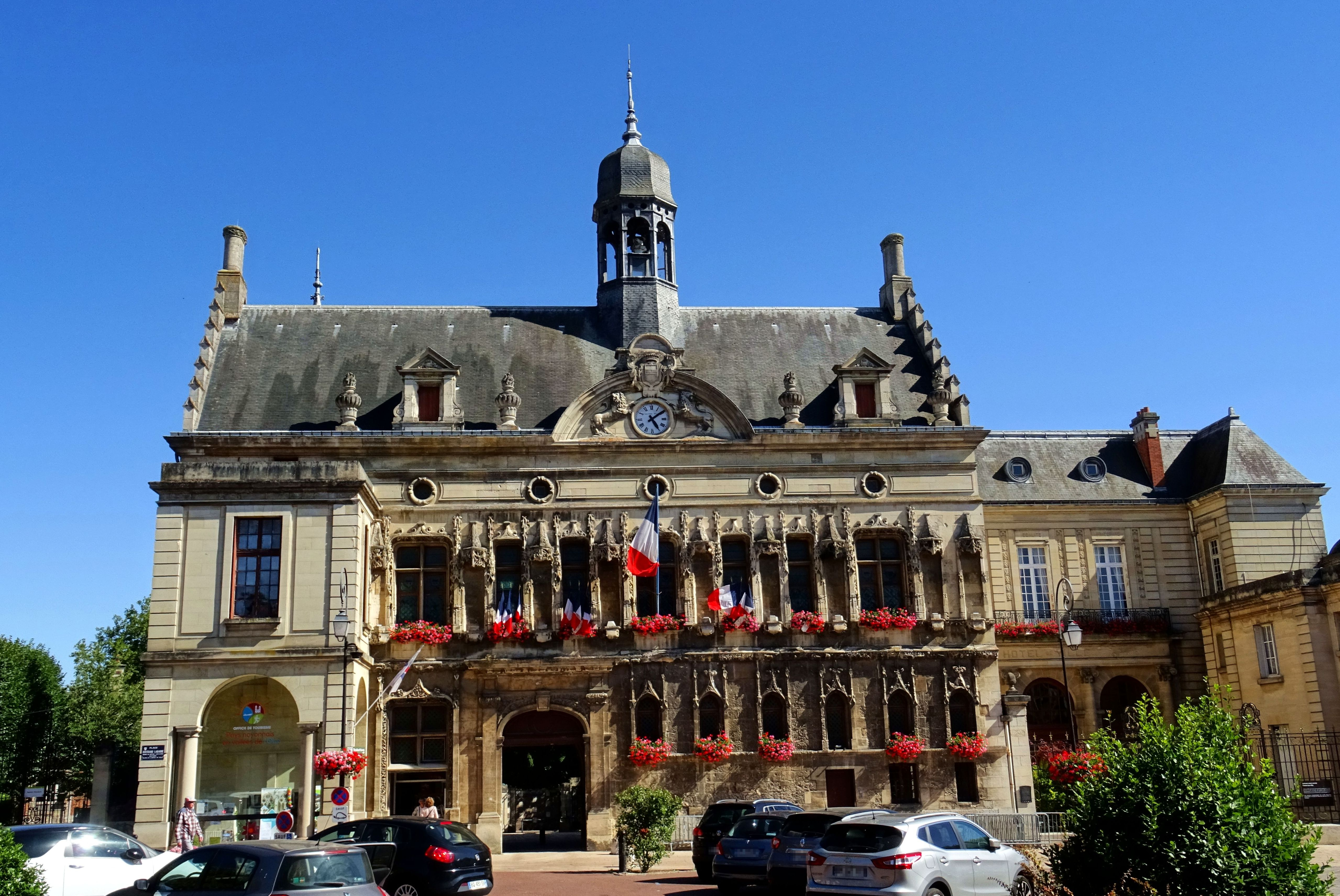
The Hôtel de Ville

The town was founded as Noviomagus (Celtic for "New Field" or "Market"). As several other cities shared the name, it was distinguished by specifying the people living in and around it. The town is mentioned in the Antonine Itinerary as being 27 Roman miles from Soissons and 34 Roman miles from Amiens, but d'Anville noted that the distance must be in error, Amiens being further and Soissons closer than indicated.

By the Middle Ages, the town's Latin name had mutated to Noviomum. The town was strongly fortified; some sections of the Roman walls still remained in late antiquity. This may explain why, around the year 531, bishop Medardus moved his seat from Vermand in the Vermandois to Noyon. (Another option was to move his seat to Saint-Quentin but the wine produced in Noyon was thought to be much better than that produced in Saint-Quentin. Other explanations are that Medardus was born near the town, at Salency, or that the place is nearer to Soissons, which was one of the royal capitals of the Merovingians.) The bishop of Noyon was also bishop of Tournai from the seventh century until Tournai was raised to a separate diocese 1146.

The cathedral at Noyon was where Charlemagne was crowned as co-king of the Franks in 768, as was the first Capetian king, Hugh Capet in 987. In 859 the town was attacked by Vikings and the bishop, Immo, captured and killed. The town received a communal charter in 1108, which was later confirmed by Philip Augustus in 1223. In the twelfth century, the diocese of Noyon was raised to an ecclesiastical duchy in the peerage of France. The Romanesque cathedral was destroyed by fire in 1131, but soon replaced by the present cathedral, Notre-Dame de Noyon, constructed between 1145 and 1235, one of the earliest examples of Gothic architecture in France. The bishop's library is a historic example of half-timbered construction.

By the Treaty of Noyon, signed on the 13 August 1516 between Francis I of France and emperor Charles V, France abandoned its claims to the Kingdom of Naples and received the Duchy of Milan in recompense. The treaty brought the War of the League of Cambrai— one stage of the Italian Wars— to a close. The Hôtel de Ville was completed in 1520.

During King Henry II's Italian war in 1557, most of Noyon was burned, in the midst of Philip II of Spain's invasion of Picardy, before returning to their winter quarters in the Spanish Netherlands.

Near the end of the sixteenth century the town fell under Habsburg control, but Henry IV of France recaptured it. The Concordat of 1801 suppressed its bishopric. The town was occupied by the Germans during World War I and World War II and on both occasions suffered heavy damage. It was the closest point on the road to Paris reached by the German armies during the Spring Offensive in 1918.

== Population ==
Historical population
Year	Pop.	±% p.a.
1968	11,603	—
1975	13,889	+2.60%
1982	14,041	+0.16%
1990	14,426	+0.34%
1999	14,471	+0.03%
2007	14,240	−0.20%
2012	13,658	−0.83%
2017	13,519	−0.20%
2023	12,971	−0.69%
Source: INSEE

== Personalities ==
- Saint Acarius, bishop of Doornik and Noyon (d. 14 March 642)
- Pope Innocent VI, Bishop of Noyon, born Étienne Aubert, Papacy (1352–1362).
- Antoine Henri de Bérault-Bercastel (1720–1794), priest, poet and historian.
- John Calvin (1509 – 1564), theologian, pastor, reformer, founder of the Calvinist movement.
- Alain Danilet (1947–2012), born in Noyon, politician.
- Pierre Descaves (1924–2014), served during World War II, municipal councillor of Noyon from 1989 to 2001, politician.
- Saint Eligius (588–660), bishop of Noyon-Tournai after Acarius (d. 1 December 660)
- Guillaume d'Ercuis (1265 – 1314/15), archdeacon, almoner, canon of the cathedral of Noyon.
- Paschal de l'Estocart (1538 or 1539 – after 1587), born in Noyon, French Renaissance composer.
- Antoine Galland (1646 – 1715), orientalist, archaeologist, first European translator of One Thousand and One Nights, completed schooling at Noyon.
- Louis-André de Grimaldi (1736 – 1804), last Peer of France as Count-Bishop of Noyon from 1777.
- François de Maucroix (1619–1708), born in Noyon, long-time friend of La Fontaine, poet and translator.
- Pierre Robert Olivétan (c. 1506 – 1538), born in Noyon, first to translate the Bible into the French language starting from the Hebrew and Greek texts.
- Jacques Sarazin (1592–1660), born in Noyon, sculptor in the classical tradition of Baroque art.
- Medardus (456 – 545), was the Bishop of Vermandois who removed the seat of the diocese to Noyon.
- Bruno Roux (born 1963), French football player and manager
- Godeberta (c. 640 – c. 700), Frankish saint, resident in a small palace at Noyon, which included a chapel dedicated to Saint George.
- Jean de Bournonville (c. 1585–1632), composer and organist.
- Simon-Jérôme Bourlet de Vauxcelles, (1733 – 1802), journalist during the French Revolution, curator of the bibliothèque de l'Arsenal (1787).
- Robert Louis Stevenson as part of An Inland Voyage visited Noyon on 17 September 1876, and mentioned its Cathedral and City Hall.

== International relations ==
Noyon is twinned with:

- - Hexham – England
- - Metzingen – Germany

== See also ==
- Communes of the Oise department
- Monument aux morts (Oise)
- Charlemagne
