= Artus Aux-Cousteaux =

French singer and composer

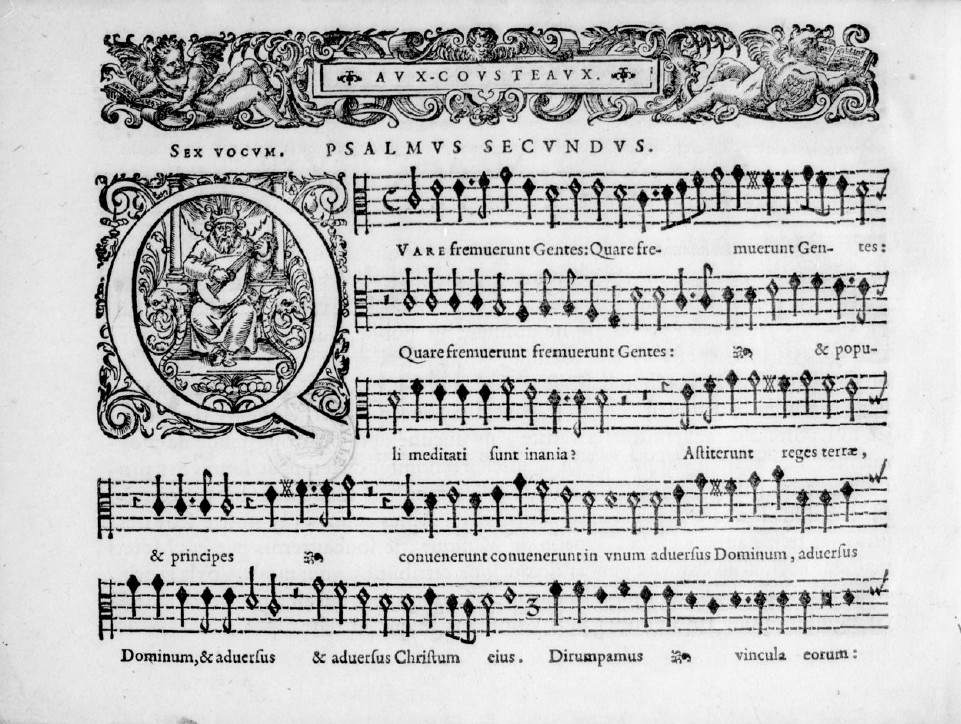
One page of Aux-Cousteaux's Psalmi aliquot... (Paris, Pierre I Ballard, 1631).

Artus Aux-Cousteaux (Hautcousteaux, Haultcousteau, Arthur d'Auxcousteaux; c. 1590–1656) was a French singer and composer, active in Picardy and Paris.

He was born in Picardy in either Beauvais (according to Charles Magnin) or Saint-Quentin (according to Charles Gomart). His family coat of arms contains a pun on his name; it is Azur à trois cousteaux, d'argent garnis d'or ("Azure on three sides, of silver decorated with gold").

He was a singer in the church of Noyon, of which fact there is a record in the library of Amiens. Then he became Maistre de la Sainte Chapelle at Paris. According to the preface to Antoine Godeau's 1656 psalter published by Pierre Le Petit, he was an haute-contre in the chapel of Louis XIII.

He left many masses and chansons, all printed by Pierre I Ballard of Paris. His style is remarkably in advance of his contemporaries, and François-Joseph Fétis believes him to have studied the Italian masters.

== Sources ==
Jean-Paul C. Montagnier, The Polyphonic Mass in France, 1600-1780: The Evidence of the Printed Choirbooks, Cambridge: Cambridge University Press, 2017.
