= Antoine Henri de Bérault-Bercastel =

French priest and Catholic historian

Antoine Henri de Bérault-Bercastel (1720–1794) was a French priest and Catholic historian.

== Biographical details ==
Born 22 November 1720, at Briey, Lorraine in France. At an early age he entered the Society of Jesus, but left it after his ordination to the priesthood. He was made parish priest of Omerville and later a canon of Noyon. He died about 1794 at Noyon.

== Histoire de l'église ==
His most important work is entitled "Histoire de l'église" (in English: "History of the Church") and was issued at Paris, 1778–90, in twenty-four volumes. The history gives a circumstantial account of the Catholic Church from the time of its founding up to the year 1721. It is not so much intended for students and learned investigators as for educated Christians, and especially for those priests whose professional cares do not allow them time to carry on higher studies. On account of its general usefulness his work has had a large circulation; in spite of many defects, especially in the later volumes, it has often been republished, as at Maastricht (1780–91), at Toulouse (1811). It has also been translated into foreign languages; it was published in Italian at Venice (1793), and in German at Vienna (1784). Various scholars have continued the history or have issued it in a condensed form. Instances are the edition of Guillon (Besançon, and Paris, 1820–21), that of Pelier de la Croix (Ghent, 1829–33), and that of Robiano (Lyon and Paris, 1835 and 1842). The best edition, with a continuation up to 1844, was edited by Henrion (Paris, 1844). The best condensed edition was edited by Gams (Innsbruck, 1854–60).
