= Pierre Descaves =

French politician

- Born: 1 October 1924; Khenchela, French Algeria
- Died: 7 May 2014 (aged 89); Neuilly-sur-Seine, France
- Occupation: Politician

Pierre Descaves (1 October 1924 – 7 May 2014) was a French politician.

== Early life ==
Pierre Descaves was born on 1 October 1924 in Khenchela, French Algeria.

== Career ==
Descaves served during World War II. During the Algerian War, he served in the Organisation armée secrète.

He joined the National Front in 1983. He served as a member of the National Assembly from 1986 to 1988, representing Oise. He ran unsuccessfully to become the Mayor of Noyon in 1995, by a small margin. Nevertheless, he served on its city council from 1989 to 2001.

In 2009, he left the National Front and joined the Party of France, founded by Carl Lang.

He wrote five books.

== Death ==
He died at the American Hospital of Paris in Neuilly-sur-Seine on 7 May 2014 at the age of eighty-nine.

== Bibliography ==
- La Guerre des immondes (Paris: Editions Godefroy de Bouillon, 2002).
- Des rêves suffisamment grands (prefaced by Jean-Claude Martinez, Paris: Déterna, 2005).
- La Salsa des cloportes (prefaced by Bruno Gollnisch, Paris: Déterna, 2006).
- Une autre histoire de l'OAS : Topologie d'une désinformation (La Chaussée-d'Ivry: Atelier Fol'Fer, 2008).
- Interdit aux chiens d'aboyer ! (La Chaussée-d'Ivry: Atelier Fol'fer, 2011).
