= Annibal Gantez =

French composer and singer

Annibal Gantez (24 December 1607 – 1668) was a French composer and singer from the Baroque era. He is undoubtedly one of the most striking examples of a "vicarious" chapel master, that is, moving from post to post to earn a living, as many of his 17th century colleagues did. His route can be traced from two types of sources: letters from L'Entretien des musiciens, which he published in 1643, and various archival documents.

== Biography ==
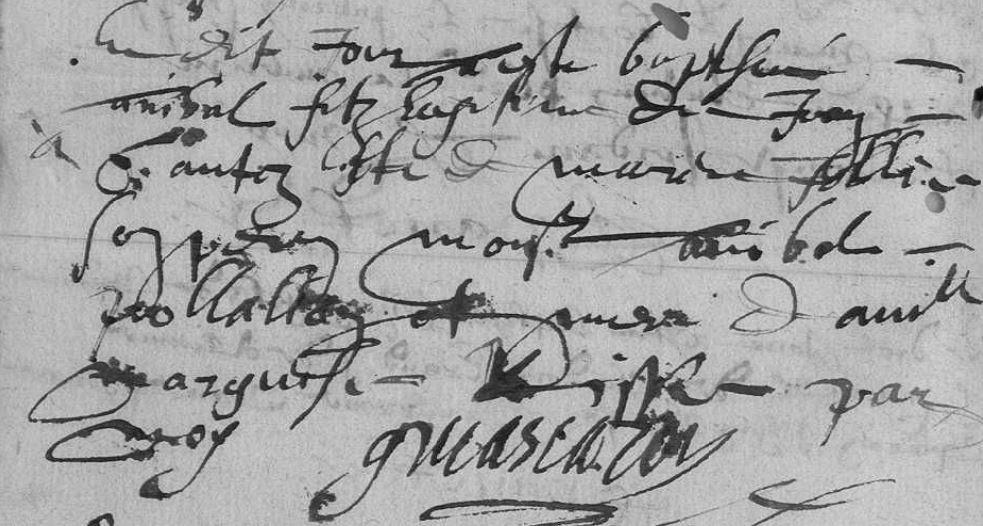
Baptism act of Annibal Gantez, 24 December 1607, Cathedral La Major of Marseille (AD Bouches-du-Rhône : 201 E 11).

Born in Marseille, Gantez was baptized at the Notre-Dame La Major Cathedral. He was the son of Jean Gantez [Gantes, Gantès, Ganteze...] (whose father was a tailor and a native of Cuers) and Marie Joly [Jollie]. His parents had married in Aix-en-Provence on 19 September 1599. He was a godchild of Annibal Pollalion and Marquise Visse. As is often the case at this time, his conditions for learning music are unknown. It is when he reached the age of almost twenty that we begin to be able to follow him on his journey.

=== From Marseille to Marseille via Toulon, Grenoble, Rouen, Le Havre, La Châtre, Aurillac, Avignon, and Montauban ===
He first appeared in Toulon (c. 1627–1628, after Lettre XXVIII), then was maître de chapelle at the collégiale Saint-André de Grenoble from 29 March 1628 and at least until July 7, but where he did not stay long. The chapter registers of the Rouen Cathedral reveal that he sang on 18 and 21 June 1629 at the Grand Masses. He subsequently went (after his Lettres) at Le Havre, La Châtre and Aurillac, then in Avignon where he worked simultaneously at the Saint-Pierre d'Avignon Basilica and the Notre-Dame des Doms Cathedral, again for a short period from December 1631 to June 1632. In this last position he was replaced by Sauvaire Intermet. His discharge from St. Peter's Church is mentioned in Lettre VIII.

From there, he went back to the Église Saint-Jacques de Montauban (Lettre II), for a short period of time since he was dismissed one year before the end of his contract, and then moved on to the Notre-Dame-des-Sablons d'Aigues-Mortes church where his presence is documented in 1633 and remained there until at least June 1635, in March 1636 at best, being replaced by messire Eruin. The chapter seems to have been satisfied with his services since it offered to marry there to fix him in Aigues-Mortes, unsuccessfully - and this would show that he was not yet a priest at that time.

Gantez then returned to practise in Marseille, in an unidentified church. He was probably ordained a priest at that time.

=== Aix-en-Provence and Arles ===
He then moved on to the mastery of Saint-Sauveur of Aix-en-Provence, of good reputation, where he was hired on 15 April 1636 for the annual wages of 200 lt. He remained there for two years and two months, succeeding Jehan Darbes. He lived next door to organist Louis d'Aranda, grammar master Audibert and seven singers. Obtaining a chaplaincy on 6 March 1638 shows that he was appreciated by the chapter but he was finally dismissed on 23 June, having aroused complaints, being replaced only on 23 September by Jehan Garsin.

Gantez then moved to the Church of St. Trophime, Arles, also of good reputation, where he was received on 5 July 1638. There, he succeeded master Baldouyn; then again, he did not stay very long since he left his post around March or April 1640 to go to Paris.

=== Paris ===
In Paris, Gantez held two successive positions: The first at Saint-Paul-Saint-Louis, the second at the Église des Saints-Innocents. For Saint-Paul, he claims to have succeeded "by adventure", even though the dedication to abbot des Roches - a close relative of Cardinal Richelieu - of his mass Laetimini, published in 1641, shows that he may have had some support. He is said to have worked under the direction of priest Nicolas Mazure, who was considered to be uncomfortable. As for the Saints- Innocents, he acceded to it by competition, but the publication of the Mass "Vigilate" in 1642 and the dedication that he made of it to Mademoiselle de Saint-Géran also reveals support. The execution of this second mass at the Couvent des Minimes de la place Royale with musicians from the Sainte-Chapelle and Notre-Dame is a sign that at that time Gantez was able to enjoy a certain visibility. The precise periods of Gantez's exercise in these two churches are unknown, but the dates of the dispatches he sends of his masses give indications: in December 1640 he was at St. Paul's and in July 1642 at the Saints-Innocents. One will hardly be surprised to read that he got along badly with the priests of these two parishes, and that he kept a bitter memory of this Paris episode.

=== Auxerre ===
It is at the Saint-Étienne d'Auxerre Cathedral, where he was appointed on 27 June 1643, that Gantez held the longest post in his career. It was there that shortly after his arrival, in 1643, he published L'Entretien des musiciens, a collection of letters that would enduringly establish his posterity, being an irreplaceable testimony to the life of the maîtres de chapelle in the 17th century.

Bishop Pierre de Broc gave him a semi-prebendary, a sign of his willingness to bind him, and it is known from a history of relics that Gantez was still there in 1650. We know little or nothing about the conditions of his position in Auxerre, except that he was appreciated by his bishop and had to feed the children of the mastery. Again, we do not know why Gantez left this position.

On the title page of L'Entretien des musiciens, Gantez is described as Prieur de la Magdaleine en Provance. This benefit could relate to the sanctuary of Sainte-Madeleine located at the Saint-Maximin-la-Sainte-Baume convent (Var), but Gantez is not on this house's priory list.

=== Carcassonne, Grenoble, Nevers, Arles, Auxerre and Nancy ===
The letters of L'Entretien des musiciens obviously being silent on the part of his career after 1643, this period can no longer be reconstructed with as much certainty.

It was in Carcassonne that Gantez first reappeared, enlisted on 26 July 1654 at the Basilica of Saints Nazarius and Celsus, dependent on him to educate and nurture four altar boys, dependent also on him to recruit a sub-master to assist him. He succeeded a certain Fabre there, and held this post until February 1656 at the latest. A letter addressed to his uncle, canon of La Major de Marseille, to suggest that he cede his canonate to him reveals that Gantez was already bitter, not being able to settle anywhere, but still ambitious... Obtaining a canonry would have allowed him to secure his old age without continuing his pilgrimages, but the uncle apparently did not give in.

Gantez, for the second time, went through Saint-André de Grenoble, where he was received on 28 June 1656 as a regular priest in charge of music but without the title of music master, at the salary of 53 écus and 20 sols but on 9 October, he quickly applied for leave of absence to manage his affairs. On 26 January 1657 he requested his leave to settle in Nevers.

In Nevers there is no trace of Gantez, except for the above-mentioned letter. A second time, he went to Saint-Trophime d'Arles, hired on 18 December 1657 as maître de chapelle but here again he was replaced as of January 1658 by a certain Cordier!

A second time, once again, he went to Auxerre, since he said in the dedication of his song Patapatapan, published in 1661 for the birth of the Dauphin, that he had just been put in possession of the mastery of Saint-Étienne d'Auxerre on the day of All Saints Day (1 November) and that he composed a Te Deum for this royal occasion.

The last known trace of Gantez's career is that of master of the chapel of Charles IV, Duke of Lorraine in Nancy, when he is reported in 1665 about a payment of 200 francs for the food of altar children. The same source indicates that he received a pension to retire in Provence in 1666 (probably in Marseilles?), at the age of fifty-nine, so if Le Cerf de la Viéville's anecdote about his mass on Allons en Candie is true, he still lived in 1668 or 1669, but we do not know where. His death certificate has not been found yet.

The twenty or so positions he held, often for short periods of time, with the exception of Auxerre's, may reveal a somewhat difficult or even insolent character - some of the events described in his "Letters" show that he sometimes showed little hierarchical respect.

== Musical works ==
=== Secular music ===
- [Airs à quatre parties]. Paris: Jacques I ou Jacques II de Sanlecque, circa 1640-1642 ? 4 vol. in-4^{o}. Guillo 2010 n^{o} JS-2.

Dedication to marshal Charles de Schomberg (Lettre LIII). The edition is lost but attested by several mentions in booksellers' or collectors' catalogues.
The study of L'Entretien (Lettres XII, XIX, XLI and LVI) reveals the incipits of ten airs likely to have been part of this collection (see the list in Guillo 2010). Perhaps the next tune was also included.

- Je cherche les nuits les plus sombres. Air noted in the manuscript Paris BNF (Mus.) : RES VMA MS 854.
- Patapatapan, ça marchons tous à la guerre [3 v.]. Paris, Robert III Ballard, 1661. 3 vol. 4^{o}. Guillo 2003 no. 1661-L, RISM G 335.

Chanson à boire composed on the occasion of the birth of the Grand Dauphin on 1 November 1661. The edition is attributed to Robert III Ballard according to typographical material. Paris BSG : Rés Vm7.

=== Sacred music ===
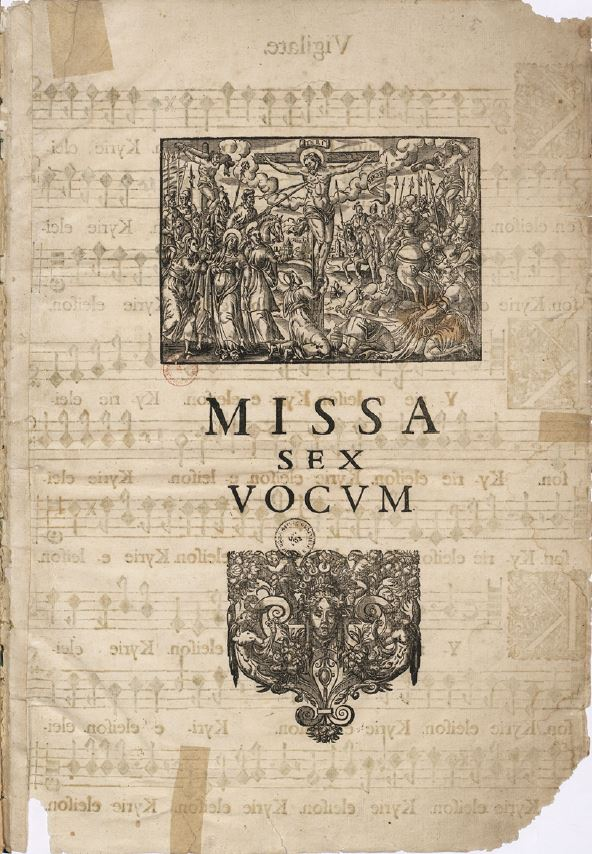
Messe Vigilate d'Annibal Gantez (Paris : J. II de Sanlecque, 1642).

- Missa quatuor vocum Laetamini, authore Annibale Gantez, In concentu Sancti Pauli Parisiorum Sacræ modulationis Moderatore. Paris: Robert III Ballard, 1641. 1 vol. in-2^{o}. Guillo 2003 no. 1641-C, RISM G 334.

Paris Maz. : Rés F^{o} 1170 K (copy of the dedication, bound with the coats of arms of Le Masle).
Dédicace à Monsieur [Michel] Le Masle, prieur des Roches, Montdidier, Long-Pont, &c. conseiller du Roy en ses Conseils d'Estat & Privé, chantre & chanoine de l'Église de Paris, Grand Vicaire de Monseigneur le cardinal de Richelieu, &c. The dedication was taken over by Gantez to form Lettre XLIV of his Entretien des musiciens. The work is also mentioned in Lettres XXVII and LIII.
Modern edition : Versailles, CMBV, 2009 (see here).
The chapter registers of the Cathédrale Saint-Pierre-et-Saint-Paul of Troyes, end of December 1640 indicate that Gantez sent a copy of this mass to the Cathedral chapter in Troyes at the end of December 1640 (which did not prevent Ballard from dating it to 1641). In 1641, he sent another one to the Saint-Trophime mastery of Arles.

- Missa sex vocum [Vigilate]. Paris: Jacques II de Sanlecque, 1642. 1 vol. in-plano, 20 f. Guillo 2010 no. JS-3, RISM G 333. *Paris BSG : Rés. V.Fol. 197-2 inv. 240 (1st piece). Internet Archive read here.

Mass dedicated to Mlle de Saint-Géran. The dedication is transcribed in L'Entretien, Lettre VI. It is quoted several times in L'Entre des musiciens, as in Lettre LIII, where it is said that Gantez made it heard by the Minime Fathers of the Place Royale, with the help of the best singers of Sainte-Chapelle and Notre-Dame.
Gantez sent a copy to the Cathedral chapter of Troyes in July 1642.

- Votum pro Ludovico XIII. iustissimo invictissimoq. Franc. et Nav. rege. Authore Annibal Gantez. In concenti SS. Innocentium Sacrae modulationi Moderator. Paris : Jacques II de Sanlecque, 1642. 1 vol. in-plano, 2 f. Guillo 2010 no. JS-4. Paris BSG : Rés. V.Fol. 197-2 inv. 240 (2nd piece). The title is pasted against the last page of the Vigilate mass.

Includes the Domine salvum fac Regem motet, 4 v.

- [Mass in imitation of the song Allons en Candie], lost, composed around 1668-1669 (referring to the French expedition of Candia (Crete). Mentioned by Le Cerf 1705, 3rd part, (p. 136).
- Te Deum, composed at Auxerre in 1661 for the birth of the Dauphin (see biography above).
- Salvum me fac Deus, lost motet composed before 1643 (mentioned in Lettre XXXV).

== Literary works ==
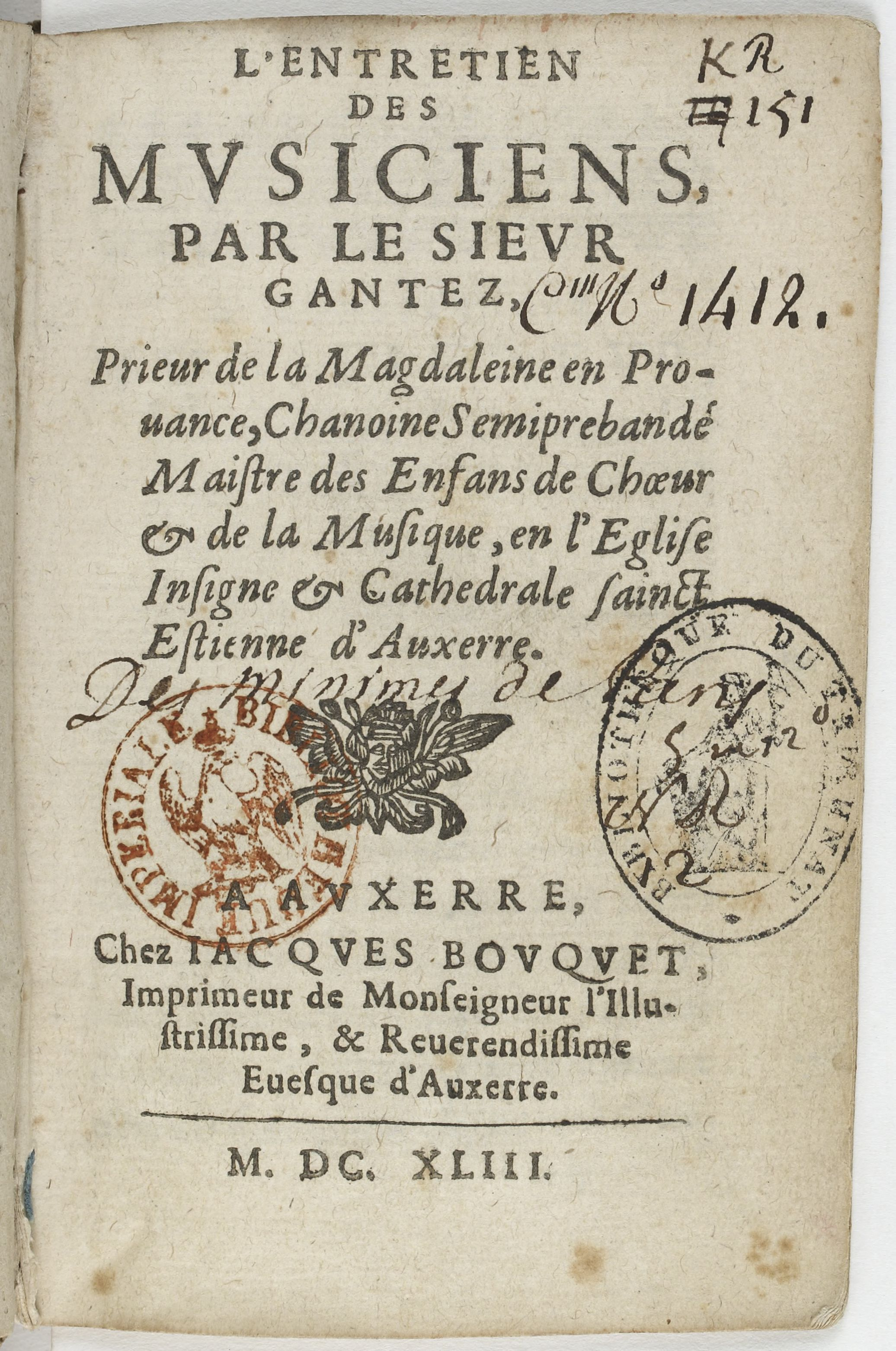
L'Entretien des musiciens by Annibal Gantez (Auxerre : 1643). Paris BNF.

- Gantez Annibal, L'Entretien des musiciens. Auxerre: Jacques Bouquet, 1643. In-12^{o}, 295 p. Gallica read here. Reprint Geneva: Minkoff, 1971.

Dedication to Pierre de Broc, Bishop of Auxerre with a dedication and foreword entitled Advertissement aux chantres, as well as an ode by Louis-Gabriel Brosse to the author's praise.
Contains 57 letters, neither dated nor numbered, most of them fictitious but containing numerous allusions to his career or to contemporary musicians. "Letter XLIV" reproduces the dedication of the Misse Laetamini (1641) and "Letter VI" the dedication to Mademoiselle de Saint-Géran for the Vigilate mass.
The work is commented in Lebeuf, 1738.
For the numbering of "Letters" and useful notes, use the reissue by Ernest Thoinan (Paris, 1878), at Internet Archive.

== Discography ==
- L'épopée d'Annibal Gantez: messe Vigilate for 6 voices (1643) et Lettres. Ensemble Vox cantoris, dir. Jean-Christophe Candau and Marie-Christine Barraut, narrator. 1 CD Psalmus, 2009.

== Sources ==
- J. H. Albanès, Le Couvent royal de Saint-Maximin en Provence de l'ordre des Frères prêcheurs : ses prieurs, ses annales, ses écrivains.... Marseille : 1880.
- Jean-Louis Bonnet, Bouzignac, Moulinié et les musiciens en pays d'Aude, XVIe-XVIIe siècles. Béziers, 1988.
- Florence Chappée, "Annibal Gantez, auteur de L'Entretien des musiciens (1643)", Maîtrises & chapelles aux XVIIe et XVIIIe siècles : des institutions musicales au service de Dieu, dir. Bernard Dompnier (Clermont-Ferrand: Presses universitaires Blaie-Pascal, 2003), (pp. 271–289).
- Florence Chappée, Annibal Gantez : contribution à la vie musicale en France, au XVIIe. Thesis in musicology, Paris 4 University, 1994.
- Laurent Guillo, Pierre I Ballard et Robert III Ballard, imprimeurs du roy pour la musique (1599-1673). Sprimont : Mardaga; Versailles: Centre de Musique Baroque de Versailles, 2003. 1550 p. in 2 vol.
- Laurent Guillo, "Les éditions musicales imprimées par Jacques I de Sanlecque, Jacques II de Sanlecque et Marie Manchon, veuve Sanlecque (Paris, c. 1633-1661)", La, la, la... Maistre Henri : mélanges de musicologie offerts à Henri Vanhulst (Turnhout : Brepols; Tours : CESR, 2010), (pp. 257–295). HAL Read here.
- Albert Jacquot. La musique en Lorraine : étude rétrospective d'après les archives locales. Third edition. Paris: 1886.
- Pierre Langlois, Discours de réception de M. l'abbé Langlois, contenant la revue des maîtres de chapelle et musiciens de la métropole de Rouen, prononcé dans la séance du 28 juin 1850. Rouen: A. Peron, 1850. Gallica.
- Jean Lebeuf, Mémoires concernant l'histoire civile et ecclésiastique d'Auxerre et de son ancien diocèse. Tome 2... continués jusqu'à nos jours avec addition de nouvelles preuves et annotations, par M. Challe... M. Quantin... Auxerre : Perriquet, 1848. on Internet Archive.
- Jean Lebeuf, "Lettre écrite... au R.P.N. au sujet d'un auteur de Bourgogne très peu connu", Mercure de France, December 1738, (pp. 2548–2557)
- Jean Le Cerf de la Viéville, Comparaison de la musique italienne et de la musique française.... Brussel: F. Foppens, 1705.
- Jean-Paul Montagnier, The Polyphonic Mass in France, 1600-1780: The Evidence of the Printed Choirbooks, Cambridge: Cambridge University Press, 2017.
- Félix Raugel, "La Maîtrise de la cathédrale d'Aix-en-Provence", Bulletin de la société d'étude du XVIIe 21-22 (1954), (pp. 422–432).
- Louis Royer, "Les musiciens et la musique à l'ancienne collégiale Saint-André de Grenoble du XVe au XVIIIe siècle", Humanisme et Renaissance 4 (1937), (pp. 237–273).
- Charles Vincens, "Rapport sur un manuscrit d'Annibal Gantez", Mémoires de l'Académie des sciences, lettres et beaux-arts de Marseille, 1888-1892 (Marseille, 1892), (pp. 337–352).
