= Child marriage =

Marriage with someone under the legal age

Child marriage is a practice involving a marriage or domestic partnership, formal or informal, that includes an individual under 18 and an adult or other child.

Research has found that child marriages have many long-term negative consequences for child brides and grooms. Girls who marry as children often lack access to education and future career opportunities. It is also common for them to have adverse health effects resulting from early pregnancy and childbirth. Effects on child grooms may include the economic pressure of providing for a household and various constraints in educational and career opportunities. Child marriage is part of the practice of child betrothal, often including civil cohabitation and a court approval of the engagement. Some factors that encourage child marriages include poverty, bride price, dowries, cultural traditions, religious and social pressure, regional customs, fear of the child remaining unmarried into adulthood, illiteracy, and the perceived inability of women to work.

Research indicates that comprehensive sex education can prevent child marriages. The rate of child marriages can also be reduced by strengthening rural communities' education systems. Rural development programs that provide basic infrastructure, including healthcare, clean water, and sanitation, may aid families financially. Child marriages have historically been common and continue to be widespread, particularly in developing nations in Africa, South Asia, Southeast Asia, West Asia, Latin and North America, and Oceania. However, developed nations also face a lack of protections for children. In the United States, for instance, child marriage is still legal in 34 states. Although the age of majority (legal adulthood) and marriage age are typically 18 years old, these thresholds can differ in different jurisdictions. In some regions, the legal age for marriage can be as young as 14, with cultural traditions sometimes superseding legal stipulations. Additionally, jurisdictions may allow loopholes for parental/guardian consent or teenage pregnancy.

Child marriage is increasingly viewed as a form of child sexual abuse. It is an internationally recognized health and human rights violation disproportionately affecting girls, globally. It is described by experts as torture; cruel, inhuman, or degrading treatment; and contrary to human rights. The Committee on the Rights of the Child "reaffirms that the minimum age limit should be 18 years for marriage."

Child marriage has been decreasing in prevalence in most of the world. UNICEF data from 2018 showed that about 21% of young women worldwide (aged 20 to 24) were married as children. This shows a 25% decrease from 10 years prior. The countries with the highest known rates of child marriages were Niger, Chad, Mali, Bangladesh, Guinea, the Central African Republic, Mozambique and Nepal, all of which had rates above 50% between 1998 and 2007. According to studies conducted between 2003 and 2009, the marriage rate of girls under 15 years old was greater than 20% in Niger, Chad, Bangladesh, Mali, and Ethiopia. In the US from 2000 to 2015, there were more than 200 thousand marriages of minors. Each year, an estimated 12 million girls globally are married under the age of 18.

== History ==
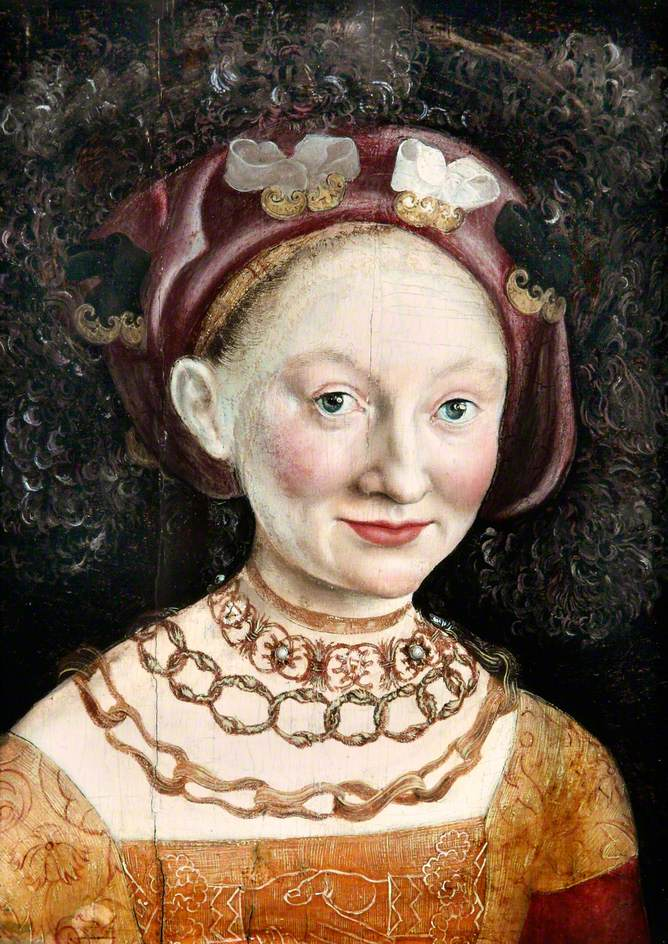
In 1533, 17-year-old Princess Emilia of Saxony was wed to George the Pious, Margrave of Brandenburg-Ansbach, then aged 48 years. Early marriages have been common in historical times, including in Europe.

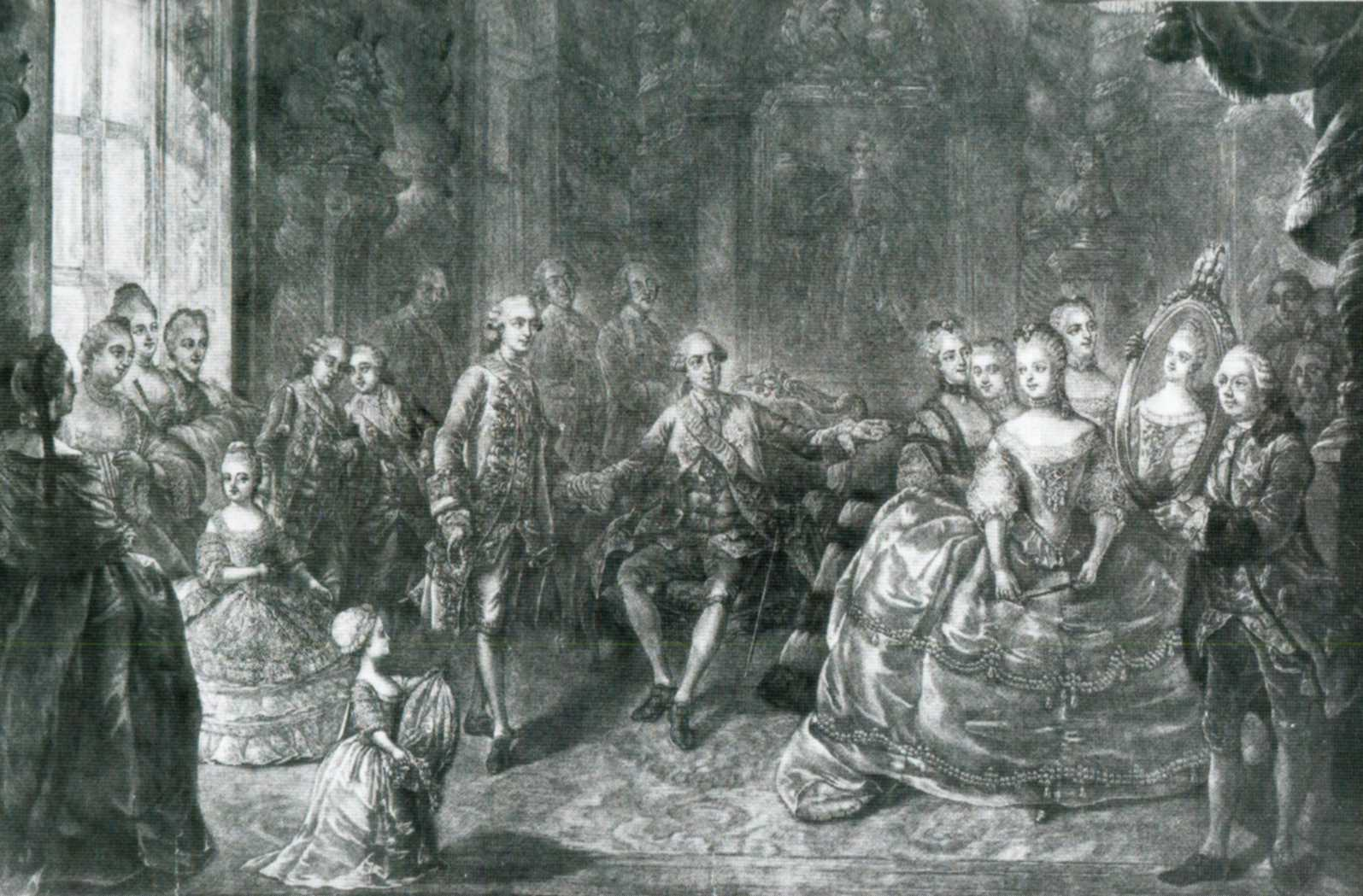
Presentation of Marie Antoinette to Dauphin Louis Auguste at Versailles, before their marriage – she was at age 15, he was 16 – on 16 May 1770

Prior to the Industrial Revolution, women around the world were often married at an early age, usually soon after reaching puberty. These practices carried over well into the 19th century in societies with largely rural populations. Men tended to marry later in societies where a married couple was expected to establish a household of their own. This encouraged men to remain unmarried until they accumulated sufficient wealth to support a new home and marry adolescent girls.

In many ancient and medieval societies, it was common for girls to be betrothed at or even before the age of puberty. According to Mordechai A. Friedman, "arranging and contracting the marriage of a young girl were the undisputed prerogatives of her father in Ancient Israel." Most girls were married before the age of 15, often at the start of puberty. It has been claimed that in the Middle Ages, marriage took place around puberty throughout the Jewish world.

Ruth Lamdan writes, "The numerous references to child marriage in the 16th-century Responsa literature and other sources shows that child marriage was so common, it was virtually the norm. In this context, it is important to remember that in halakha, the term "minor" refers to a girl under twelve years and a day old. A girl aged twelve and a half was considered an adult in all respects."

In Ancient Greece, early marriage and teenage motherhood for girls existed. Boys were also expected to marry in their teens. In the Roman Empire, girls were married at the age of 12 and boys from the age of 14. In the Middle Ages, under English civil laws derived from Roman laws, marriages before the age of 16 existed. In Imperial China, child marriage was the norm.

In contrast to other pre-modern societies—and for reasons that are subject to debate—Northwest Europe was characterized by relatively late marriages for both men and women, with both sexes commonly delaying marriage until their mid-20s, although the very wealthy, especially aristocrats, married earlier, but they were a minority of the population. The data available for England suggest this was the case by the 14th century. The pattern was reflected in English Common Law, which was the first in Western Europe to establish statutory rape laws and ages of consent for marriage. In 1275, sexual relations with girls under either 12 or 14 (depending on the interpretation of the sources) were criminalized; a second law with more severe punishments for those under the age of 10 was enacted in 1576. In the late 18th and early 19th centuries, the British colonial administration introduced marriage age restrictions for Hindu and Muslim girls in the Indian subcontinent.

A Scottish physician living in 18th century Syria reported that locals tried to contract marriages for their children at a young age, but the marriage was not consummated until the girl "had come of age". Evidence from 19th century Levant, (now Israel and Palestine) suggests that husbands often initiated sexual relations before their wives reached puberty, but that it was a disapproved occurrence, condemned socially and censured by sharia courts. Writing in the 1830s, Edward William Lane observed that few Egyptian girls remained single by the age of 16, but socioeconomic transformation, educational reform, and modernity brought significant changes. By 1920, less than 10% of Egyptian women married before the age of 20. In 1923, Egypt's parliament set the minimum age of marriage at 16 for women and 18 for men.

For the latter half of the 19th century, between 13 and 18% of native-born white female first marriages in the United States were of girls under the age of 18.

== Religious norms and laws ==
This map shows all countries where child marriage without any exceptions was prohibited between 2013 and 2025.

Most religions practiced throughout history have established a minimum age for marriage.

By the beginning of the 21st century, most countries had enacted laws establishing the general minimum age for marriage at 18 years. However, in many of these countries, some exceptions allowed marriage before this age with the consent of the parents and/or by court decision. In some countries, a religious marriage is still recognized by the state authorities, while in others, a registered civil marriage is mandatory.

=== Christianity ===
Christian canon law forbade the marriage of a girl before the onset of puberty. Within the Catholic Church, before the 1917 Code of Canon Law, the minimum age for a dissoluble betrothal (sponsalia de futuro) was seven years in the contractees. The minimal age for a valid marriage was puberty, or nominally 14 for males, and 12 for females. The 1917 Code of Canon Law raised the minimal age for a valid marriage to 16 for males, and 14 for females. The 1983 Code of Canon Law maintained the minimal age for a valid marriage at 16 for males and 14 for females. (Note: While canon 1083 of the 1983 Code of Canon Law sets the minimum age for a valid marriage at 16 for males and 14 for females, canon 97 defines a person younger than 18 years of age as a minor and subject to parental authority. The authorization of the local ordinary must precede the celebration of the marriage of a minor if the marriage "cannot be recognized or celebrated according to the norm of civil law" or if the parents of a minor are "unaware or reasonably opposed". Each conference of bishops can "establish a higher age for the licit celebration of marriage". Canon 1072 requires that pastors discourage "marriage before the age at which a person usually enters marriage according to the accepted practices of the region." Edward N. Peters explains that canon 1083 "authorized episcopal conferences to recognize the concrete circumstances of marriage in their own territories and to raise the ages for licit marriages within a given nation" to more than the minimum age for a valid marriage. Other canons that regulate marriage in general also apply, for example persons "who lack the sufficient use of reason" or "who suffer from a grave defect of discretion of judgment concerning the essential matrimonial rights and duties mutually to be handed over and accepted" "are incapable of contracting marriage.") English ecclesiastical law forbade the marriage of a girl before the age of puberty.

=== Hinduism ===
In Hinduism the Vedas, specifically the Rigveda and Atharvaveda, have several verses that indicate girls were only to be married after attaining puberty. However, during the Vedic period, there is indication that girls were married before attaining and also during puberty. Some early Dharmaśāstra, which are secondary texts (Smritis) to the Vedas (Srutis), also state that girls should be married after they have attained puberty, while some Dharmaśāstra texts extend the marriageable age to before puberty.

In the Manusmriti, a father is considered to have wronged his daughter if he fails to marry her before puberty and if the girl is not married in less than three years after reaching puberty, she can search for the husband herself.

=== Islam ===
There is no minimum marriage age defined in traditional Islamic law; the legal discussion of this topic is centered primarily on female physical maturity. Classical Sunni jurisprudence allows a father to contract a marriage for his underage daughter. The appropriate age for consummating the marriage, which could occur several years after signing the marriage contract, was to be determined by the bride, groom, and the bride's guardian since medieval jurists held that the age of fitness for intercourse was too variable for legislation. This was based in part on the precedent set by the Islamic prophet Muhammad, as described in the hadith collections considered to be authentic by Muslims. According to these sources, Muhammad married Aisha, his third wife, when she was about six, (Note: some sources suggest age at marriage as six and some as seven, see Denise Spellberg (1996), Politics, Gender, and the Islamic Past: The Legacy of 'A'isha Bint Abi Bakr, Columbia University Press, ISBN 978-0231079990, pp 39–40) and consummated the marriage when she was about nine. (Note: Most sources suggest age at consummation as nine, and one that it may have been age 10; See: Denise Spellberg (1996), Politics, Gender, and the Islamic Past: The Legacy of 'A'isha Bint Abi Bakr, Columbia University Press, ISBN 978-0231079990, pp. 39–40; The Ahmadiyya sect has published the opinion of Pakistani writer Muhammad Ali that Sahih al-Bukhari is inauthentic; Ali argued that Aisha may have been a teenager.Ali, Muhammad (1997). Muhammad the Prophet. Ahamadiyya Anjuman Ishaat Islam. ISBN 978-0913321072. However, Ahmadiyya sect views about Islam and its history are widely disputed by mainstream Islam. See: Siddiq & Ahmad (1995), Enforced Apostasy: Zaheeruddin v. State and the Official Persecution of the Ahmadiyya Community in Pakistan, Law & Inequality, 14: pp. 275–284.) (Note: See: L. Ahmed, Women and the Advent of Islam, Signs, Vol. 11, No. 4 (Summer, 1986), pp. 677–678; Cynthia Gorney, "Too Young to Wed – The secret world of child brides", National Geographic, June 2011, quote: "'If there were any danger in early marriage, Allah would have forbidden it,' a Yemeni member of parliament named Mohammed Al-Hamzi told me in the capital city of Sanaa one day. 'Something that Allah himself did not forbid, we cannot forbid.' Al-Hamzi, a religious conservative, is vigorously opposed to the legislative efforts in Yemen to prohibit marriage for girls below a certain age (17, in a recent version), and so far those efforts have met with failure. Islam does not permit marital relations before a girl is physically ready, he said, but the Holy Koran contains no specific age restrictions and so these matters are properly the province of family and religious guidance, not national law. Besides, there is the matter of the Prophet Muhammad's beloved Ayesha—nine years old, according to the conventional account, when the marriage was consummated.") Some modern Muslim authors and Islamic scholars, such as Ali Gomaa, who served as the Grand Mufti of Egypt, doubt the traditionally accepted narrative and believe based on other evidence that Aisha was in her late teens at the time of her marriage.

As a general rule, intercourse was prohibited for girls who "not able to undergo it," on the grounds of potential physical harm. Disputes regarding physical maturity between the involved parties were to be resolved by a judge, potentially after examination by a female expert witness. The 1917 Codification of Islamic Family Law in the Ottoman Empire distinguished between the age of competence for marriage, which was set at 18 for boys and 17 for girls, and the minimum age for marriage, set at 12 for boys and 9 for girls. Marriage below the age of competence was permissible only if proof of sexual maturity was accepted in court, while marriage under the minimum age was forbidden. During the 20th century, sharia-based legislation in most countries in the Middle East followed the Ottoman precedent in defining the age of competence, while raising the minimum age to 15–16 for boys and 13–16 for girls. In 2019, Saudi Arabia raised the age of marriage to 18.

=== Judaism ===
Jewish halakhists and rabbis prohibit a father from betrothing a daughter while she is still a minor. A girl can be betrothed when she becomes a young woman (Hebrew: נַעֲרָה, romanized: na'arah), which may defined as a girl aged 12–12½ or one who has begun puberty. In exceptional cases, such as during exile and persecution, girls aged 4–13 years may be betrothed by their fathers. Betrothal by intercourse is forbidden and punishable by lashing. The Talmud states that, "those who marry girls who are not yet capable of bearing children" will "delay the coming of the messiah". A wide age gap between spouses, in either direction, is advised against. Marrying one's young daughter to an old man was declared as reprehensible as forcing her into prostitution. The ideal age at which a man should marry is 18. Before this age, he should spend his time studying and getting his life in order.

== Problems (gendered effects) ==
Child marriage has lasting consequences on girls, from their health (mental and physical), education, and social development perspectives. These consequences last well beyond adolescence. One of the most common causes of death for girls aged 15 to 19 in developing countries was pregnancy and childbirth. In Niger, estimated to have the world's highest rate of child marriage, approximately three out of four girls marry before their 18th birthday.

Boys are sometimes married as children, almost always to a female minor. UNICEF states that "girls [are] disproportionately affected by the practice. Globally, the prevalence of child marriage among boys is just one-sixth that among girls." Research on the effects of child marriage on underage boys is scant, which researchers state is likely because child marriage involving boys is less common and boys do not face the adverse health effects as a result of early pregnancy and childbirth. The effects of child marriage on boys include being ill-prepared for certain responsibilities such as providing for the family, early fatherhood, and a lack of access to education and career opportunities. As of September 2014, 156 million living men were married as underage boys.

In its first in-depth analysis of child grooms, UNICEF revealed that an estimated 115 million boys and men around the world were married as children. Of these, 1 in 5, or 23 million, boys were married before the age of 15. According to the data, the Central African Republic has the highest prevalence of child marriage among males (28%), followed by Nicaragua (19%) and Madagascar (13%). The estimates bring the total number of child brides and child grooms to 765 million. Girls remain disproportionately affected, with 1 in 5 young women aged 20 to 24 years old married before their 18th birthday, compared to 1 in 30 young men.

== Causes ==
According to the United Nations Population Fund, factors that promote and reinforce child marriage include poverty and economic survival strategies; gender inequality; sealing land or property deals or settling disputes; control over sexuality and protecting family honor; tradition and culture; and insecurity, particularly during war, famine or epidemics. Other factors include family ties in which marriage is a means of consolidating powerful relations between families.

=== Dowry and bride price ===
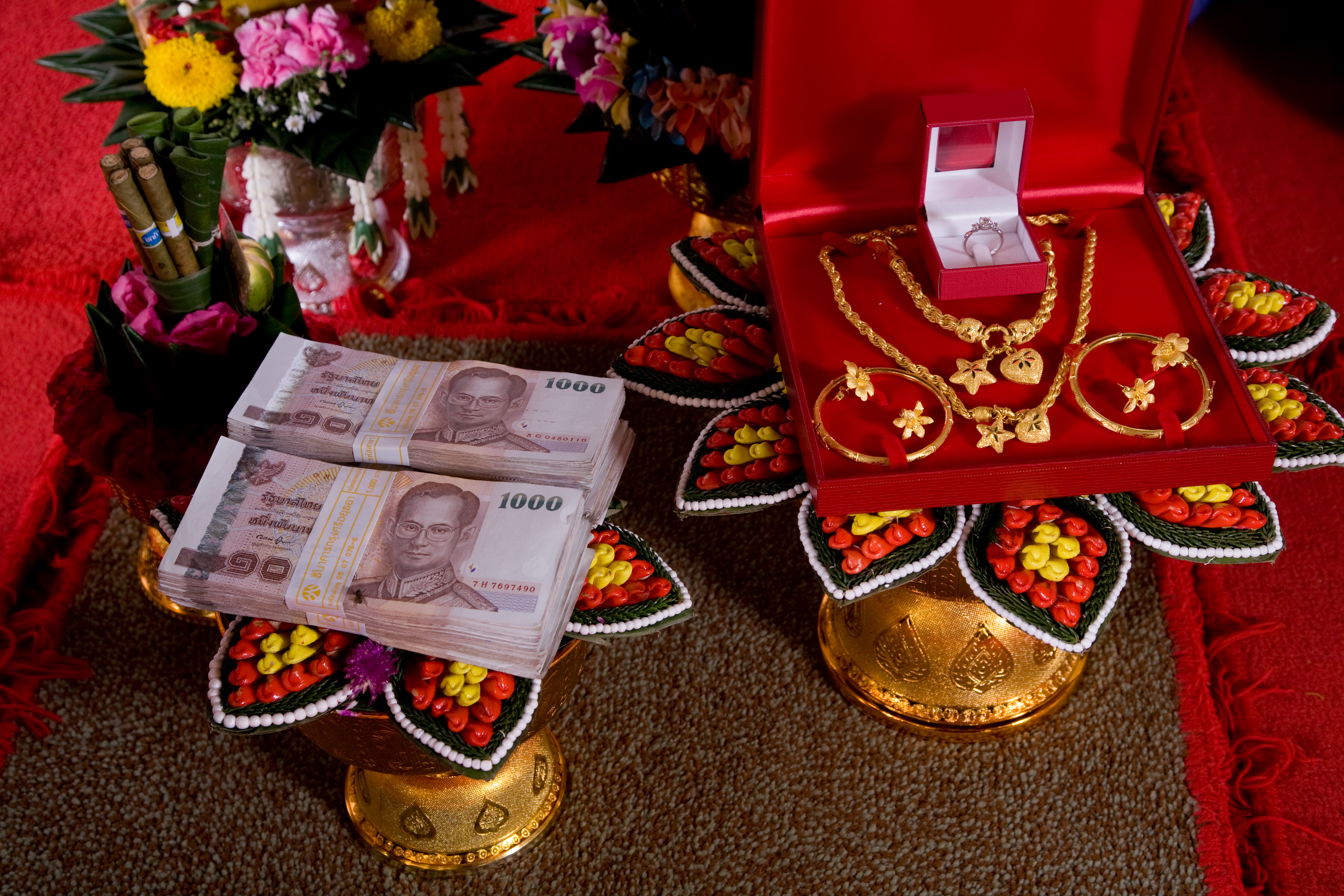
A traditional, formal presentation of the bride price at a Thai engagement ceremony

Providing a girl with a dowry at her marriage is an ancient practice that continues in some parts of the world, especially in the Indian subcontinent. Parents bestow property on the marriage of a daughter as a dowry, which is often an economic challenge for many families. The difficulty in saving for dowry was common, particularly in times of economic hardship, or persecution, or unpredictable seizure of property and savings. These difficulties pressed families to betroth their girls, irrespective of their age, as soon as they had the resources to pay the dowry. Thus, Goitein notes that European Jews would marry their girls early, once they had collected the expected amount of dowry.

A bride price is the amount paid by the groom to the parents of a bride for them to consent to him marrying their daughter. In some countries, the younger the bride, the higher the bride price. This practice can create an economic incentive where girls are sought and married early by her family to the highest bidder. Child marriages of girls can function as a way out of desperate economic conditions or simply as a source of income for the parents. Bride price is another cause of child marriage and child trafficking.

=== Bride kidnapping ===
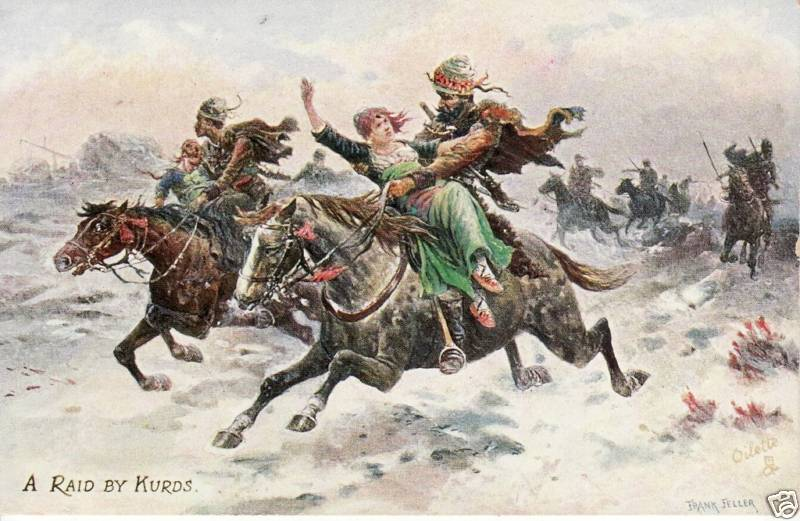
Depiction of bride kidnapping

Bride kidnapping, also known as marriage by abduction or marriage by capture, is a practice in which a male abducts the female he wishes to marry. Bride kidnapping has been practiced around the world and throughout history. It continues to occur in countries in Central Asia, the Caucasus region, parts of Africa, among people as diverse as the Hmong in Southeast Asia, the Tzeltal in Mexico, and the Romani in Europe. Bride kidnapping is a widespread issue in Ethiopia. A 2003 study found the custom's prevalence rate was estimated at 69 percent nationally, with reports of girls as young as 11 being taken for marriage. In response, Ethiopia has enacted laws to outlaw this practice and established a minimum marriage age of 18. However, the effectiveness of these measures in reducing bride kidnapping remains unclear.

In most nations, bride kidnapping is considered a crime rather than a valid form of marriage. Some types of it may also be seen as falling along the continuum between forced marriage and arranged marriage. However, even when the practice is against the law, judicial enforcement remains lax in some areas. Bride kidnapping occurs in various parts of the world, but it is most common in the Caucasus and Central Asia. Bride kidnapping is often a form of child marriage. It may be connected to the practice of bride price, and the inability or unwillingness to pay it.

=== Persecution, forced migration, and slavery ===
Social upheavals such as wars, major military campaigns, forced religious conversion, taking natives as prisoners of war and converting them into slaves, arrest and forced migrations of people often made a suitable groom a rare commodity. Bride's families would seek out any available bachelors and marry them to their daughters before events beyond their control moved the boy away. Persecution and displacement of Roma and Jewish people in Europe, colonial campaigns to get slaves from various ethnic groups in West Africa across the Atlantic for plantations, and Islamic campaigns to get Hindu slaves from India across Afghanistan's Hindu Kush as property and for work were some of the historical events that increased the practice of child marriage before the 19th century.

Among Sephardi Jewish communities, child marriages became frequent from the 10th to 13th centuries, especially in Muslim Spain. This practice intensified after the Jewish community was expelled from Spain, and resettled in the Ottoman Empire. Child marriages among the Eastern Sephardic Jews continued through the 18th century in Islamic majority regions.

=== Fear, poverty, social pressures, and a sense of protection ===
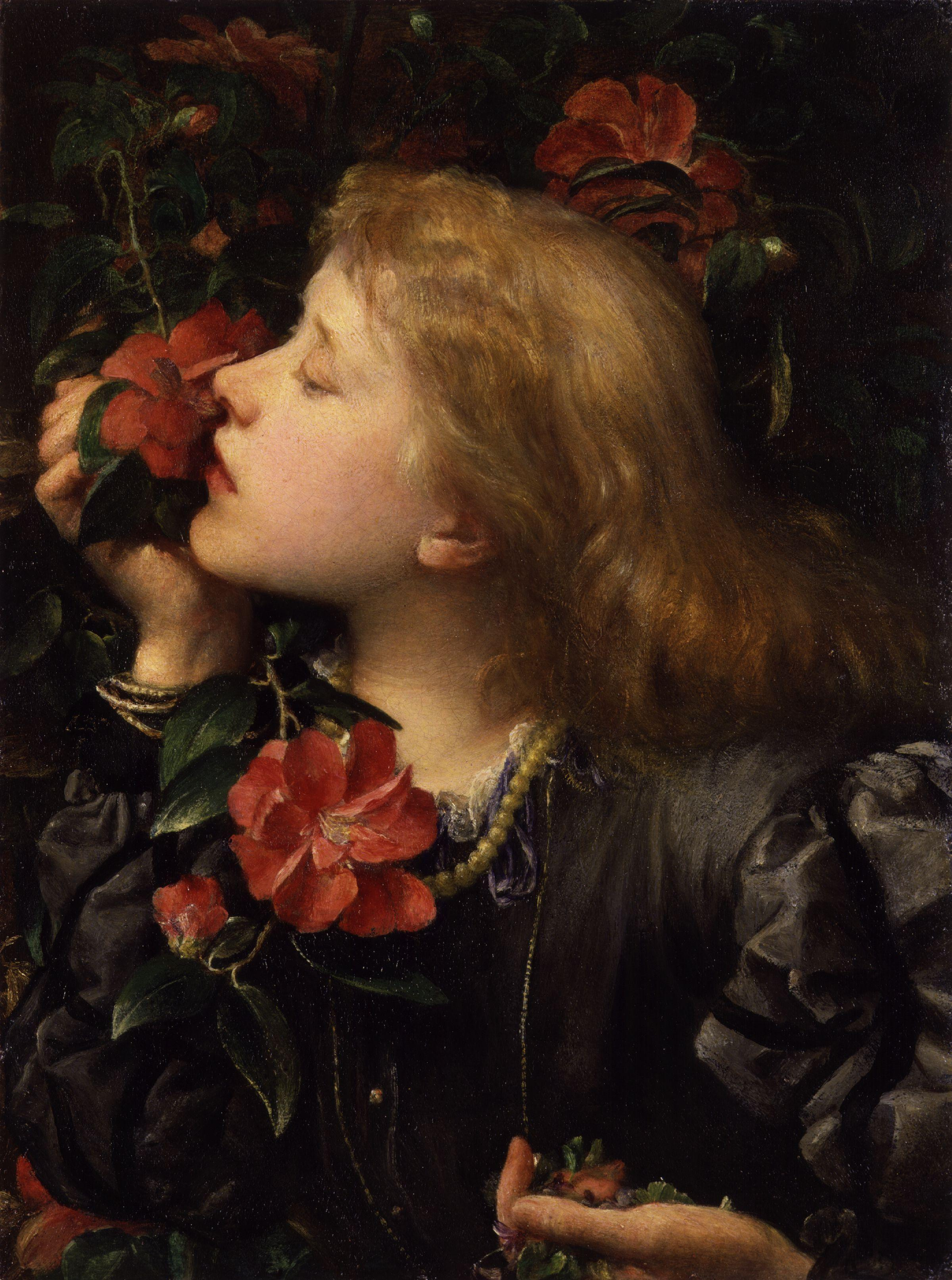
English stage actress Ellen Terry was married at age 16 to 46-year-old George Frederic Watts, a marriage her parents thought would be advantageous; later she said she was uncomfortable being a child bride. Terry died at the age of 81, in 1928.

A sense of social insecurity is a cause of child marriages across the world. For example, in Nepal, parents fear social stigma if adult daughters (past 18 years) stay at home. Others fear crimes such as rape, which not only would be traumatic but may lead to less acceptance of the girl if she becomes a victim of such a crime. For example, girls may not be seen as eligible for marriage if they are not virgins. In other cultures, the fear is that an unmarried girl may engage in illicit relationships, or elope, causing a permanent social blemish to her siblings, or that the impoverished family may be unable to find bachelors for grown-up girls in their socioeconomic group. Such fears and social pressures have been proposed as causes that lead to child marriages. Insofar as child marriage is a social norm in practicing communities, the elimination of child marriage must come through a changing of those social norms. The mindset of the communities, and what is believed to be the proper outcome for a child bride, must be shifted to bring about a change in the prevalence of child marriage.

Families in extreme poverty may perceive daughters as an economic burden. If they cannot afford to raise a child, seeking a child marriage for a girl can be seen as a way of ensuring her economic security and thus benefiting her as well as her parents. In reviews of Jewish community history, scholars claim poverty, shortage of grooms, and uncertain social and economic conditions were a cause of frequent child marriages.

An additional factor causing child marriage is the parental belief that early marriage offers protection. Parents feel that marriage provides their daughter with a sense of protection from sexual promiscuity and safe from sexually transmitted infections. However, in reality, young girls tend to marry older men, placing them at an increased risk of contracting a sexually transmitted infection.

Protection through marriage may play a specific role in conflict settings. Families may have their young daughters marry members of an armed group or military in hopes that they will be better protected. Girls may also be taken by armed groups and forced into marriages.

In many communities, there is social pressure to marry off girls at a young age. This practice is often justified by cultural norms and the belief that it provides social and economic stability.

=== Climate disasters ===
A 2023 study found that the increase in environmental disasters tied to climate change were a contributing factor to a rise in child marriage in at least 20 countries. In July 2026, an interim report on research done by Plan International and the University of Technology Sydney showed that the effects of climate change in Asia and the Pacific areas (specifically Bangladesh, Nepal, and Solomon Islands) were particularly pronounced on the lives of adolescent girls. The prevalence of child marriage increased in times of climate event stress, when families lost their livelihoods owing to flooding and other natural disasters. According to the International Rescue Committee, the rate of child marriages rose around 39 per cent after such an event, as the family could not afford to keep a daughter at home and pay for her education.

=== Religion, culture and civil law ===
Although the general marriageable age is 18 in the majority of countries, most jurisdictions allow for exceptions for underage youth with parental and/or judicial consent. Such laws are neither limited to developing countries, nor a state's religion. In some countries, a religious marriage by itself has legal validity, while in others it does not, as civil marriage is obligatory. For Catholics incorporated into the Latin Church, the 1983 Code of Canon Law sets the minimum age for a valid marriage at 16 for males and 14 for females. In 2015, Spain raised its minimum marriageable age to 18 (16 with court consent) from the previous 14. In Mexico, marriage under 18 is allowed with parental consent, from age 14 for girls and age 16 for boys. In Ukraine, in 2012, the Family Code was amended to equalize the marriageable age for girls and boys to 18, with courts being allowed to grant permission to marry from 16 years of age if it is established that the marriage is in the best interest of the youth.

Many states in the US permit child marriages with the court's permission. Since 2015, the minimum marriageable age throughout Canada is 16. In Canada, the age of majority is set by province/territory at 18 or 19, so minors under this age have additional restrictions (i.e. parental and court consent). Under the Criminal Code, Art. 293.2 Marriage under the age of 16 years reads: "Everyone who celebrates, aids or participates in a marriage rite or ceremony knowing that one of the persons being married is under the age of 16 years is guilty of an indictable offense and liable to imprisonment for a term not exceeding five years." The Civil Marriage Act also states: "2.2 No person who is under the age of 16 years may contract marriage." In the UK, marriage was allowed for 16–17 years old with parental consent in England and Wales until banned by the Marriage and Civil Partnership (Minimum Age) Act 2022 and is still allowed in Northern Ireland, and even without parental consent in Scotland. However, a marriage of a person under 16 is void under the Matrimonial Causes Act 1973. The United Nations Population Fund stated the following:

In 2010, 158 countries reported that 18 years was the minimum legal age for marriage for women without parental consent or approval by a pertinent authority. However, in 146 countries, state or customary law allows girls younger than 18 to marry with the consent of parents or other authorities; in 52 countries, girls under age 15 can marry with parental consent. In contrast, 18 is the legal age for marriage without consent among males in 180 countries. Additionally, in 105 countries, boys can marry with the consent of a parent or a pertinent authority, and in 23 countries, boys under age 15 can marry with parental consent.

A lower legally allowed marriage age does not necessarily cause high rates of child marriages. However, there is a correlation between restrictions placed by laws and the average age of first marriage. In the United States, per 1960 census data, 3.5% of girls married before the age of 16, while an additional 11.9% married between 16 and 18. States with lower marriage age limits saw higher percentages of child marriages. This correlation between the higher age of marriage in civil law and the observed frequency of child marriages breaks down in countries with Islam as the state religion. In Islamic nations, many countries do not allow child marriage of girls under their civil code of laws, but the state-recognized Sharia religious laws and courts in all these nations have the power to override the civil code, and often do. UNICEF reported in 2012 that the top eight nations in the world with the highest observed child marriage rates were Niger (75%), Chad (72%), Mali (71%), Bangladesh (64%), Guinea (63%), Central African Republic (61%), Mozambique (56%), and Nepal (51%).

=== Marriageable age in religious sources ===
==== Judaism ====
Ancient Rabbis set the age of marriage for every Israelite at 18 years old; males are expected to be married by 20 years old in teenage marriage and females can stay unmarried but must be celibate.

In Rabbinic Judaism, males cannot consent to marriage until they reach the age of 13 years and a day and have undergone puberty. They are considered minors until the age of twenty. The same rules apply to females, except their age is 12 years and a day. If females show no signs of puberty and males show no signs of puberty or do show impotence, they automatically become adults by age 35 and can marry.

A large age gap between spouses, in either direction, is advised against as unwise. A younger woman marrying a significantly older man however is especially problematic: marrying one's young daughter to an old man was declared as reprehensible as forcing her into prostitution.

A ketannah (literally meaning "little [one]") was any girl between the age of 3 years and 12 years plus one day; she was subject to her father's authority, and he could arrange a marriage for her without her agreement. However, after reaching the age of maturity, she would have to agree to the marriage to be considered married.

==== Christianity ====
The minimum ages of consent for marriage in the Catholic Church are 14 for girls and 16 for boys. Being underage constitutes a diriment impediment. That is, a marriage involving an underage bride or groom is canonically invalid. A Conference of Bishops may adopt a higher age for marriage, but in that case, the higher age only creates a prohibitive impediment, that is, a marriage involving a bride or groom above the Church's minimum age but below that set by the Conference is valid but illicit. Permission to marry against a civil authority's directive requires the permission of the Ordinary, which, in the case of sensible and equal laws regarding marriage age, is not usually granted. The permission by the Ordinary is also required in case of a marriage of a minor when their parents are unaware of his marriage or if their parents reasonably oppose the marriage.

==== Islam ====
In classical Islamic law, suitability for marital relations is conditional on physical maturity (bulugh) and mental maturity (rushd). Classical jurists did not stipulate a minimum marriageable age because they did not believe that maturity is reached by everyone at a specific age. Büchler and Schlater observe that "marriageable age according to classical Islamic law coincides with the occurrence of puberty. The notion of puberty refers to signs of physical maturity such as the emission of semen or the onset of menstruation". Traditional schools of Islamic jurisprudence (madhaahib) define the age of full legal capacity to enter marriage as follows:

| | Male age | Female age | Notes |
|---|---|---|---|
| Shafi'i | 15 | 15 | |
| Hanbali | 15 | 15 | |
| Maliki | 17 | 17 | |
| Hanafi | 12–18 | 9–17 | Marriageable age is whenever the person reaches puberty, which may vary from person to person. Listed ages are when Hanafis presume puberty occurs in males and females. |
| Jafari | 15 | 9 | Shia |

According to Büchler and Schlater, while marriageable age is not the same as the legal majority under civil law, these age limits may correspond.

The 1917 codification of Islamic family law in the Ottoman Empire distinguished between the age of competence for marriage, which was set at 18 for boys and 17 for girls, and the minimum age for marriage, which followed the traditional Hanafi ages of the legal majority of 12 for boys and 9 for girls. Marriage below the age of competence was permissible only if proof of sexual maturity was accepted in court, while marriage under the minimum age was forbidden. During the 20th century, most countries in the Middle East followed the Ottoman precedent in defining the age of competence, while raising the minimum age to 15 or 16 for boys and 13–16 for girls. Marriage below the age of competence is subject to approval by a judge and the legal guardian of the adolescent. Egypt diverged from this pattern by setting the age limits of 18 for boys and 16 for girls, without a distinction between competence for marriage and minimum age. In 2020, Saudi Arabia officially banned all marriages under the age of 18. The push to ban child marriage was initially opposed by senior clergy, who argued that a woman reaches adulthood at puberty. However, by 2019 the Saudi Shura Council had outlawed marriages under the age of 15 and required court approval for those under 18.

=== Politics and financial relationships ===
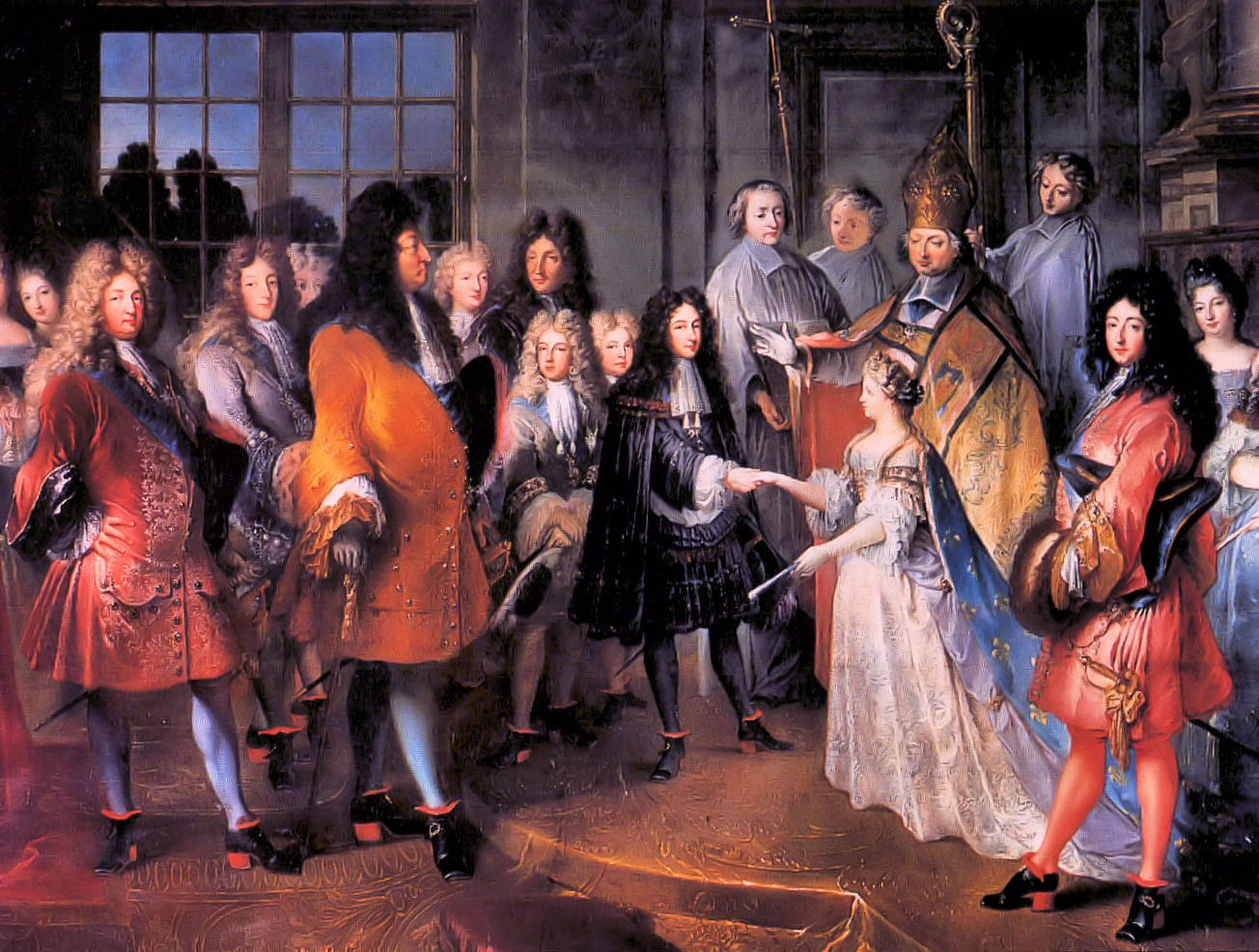
Child marriage in 1697 of Marie Adélaïde of Savoy, age 12 to Louis, heir apparent of France age 15. The marriage created a political alliance.

Child marriages may depend upon socio-economic status. The aristocracy in some cultures, as in the European feudal era tended to use child marriage as a method to secure political ties. Families were able to cement political and/or financial ties by having their children marry. The betrothal is considered a binding contract between the families and the children. The breaking of a betrothal can have serious consequences both for the families and for the betrothed individuals themselves.

== Effects on global regions ==
A UNFPA report stated: "For the period 2000–2011, just over one third (an estimated 34 percent) of women aged 20 to 24 years in developing regions were married or in union before their eighteenth birthday. In 2010 this was equivalent to almost 67 million women. About 12 percent of them were married or in union before age 15." The prevalence of child marriage varies substantially among countries. Around the world, girls from rural areas are twice as likely to marry as children as those from urban areas.

=== Africa ===
RUN, a short documentary film focusing on child marriage in Nigeria

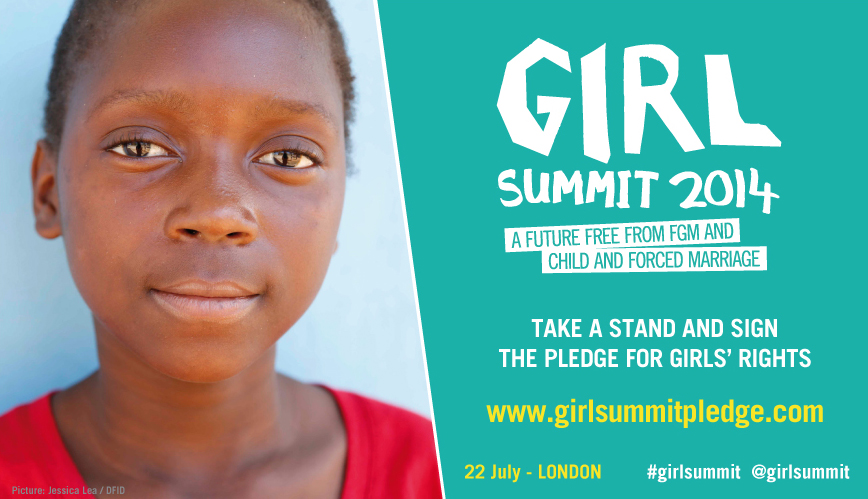
Poster against child and forced marriage

According to UNICEF, Africa has the highest incidence rates of child marriage, with over 50% of girls marrying under the age of eighteen in five nations. Girls in West and Central Africa have the highest risk of marrying in childhood. Niger has one of the highest rates of early marriage in sub-Saharan Africa. Among Nigerien women between the ages of twenty and twenty-four, 76% reported marrying before the age of eighteen, and 28% reported marrying before the age of fifteen. This UNICEF report is based on data that is derived from a small sample survey between 1995 and 2004, and the current rate is unknown given the lack of infrastructure and in some cases, regional violence.

UNICEF stated in 2018 that although the number of child marriages has declined on a worldwide scale, the problem remains most severe in Africa, despite the fact that Ethiopia cut child marriage rates by one third.

African countries have enacted marriageable age laws to limit marriage to a minimum age of 16 to 18, depending on the jurisdiction. In Ethiopia, Chad and Niger, the legal marriage age is 15, but local customs and religious courts have the power to allow marriages below 12 years of age. Child marriages of girls in West Africa, Central Africa and Northeast Africa are widespread. Additionally, poverty, religion, tradition, and conflict make the rate of child marriage in Sub-Saharan Africa very high in some regions.

In many traditional systems, a man pays a bride price to the girl's family to marry her (comparable to the customs of dowry and dower). In many parts of Africa, this payment, in cash, cattle, or other valuables, decreases as a girl gets older. Even before a girl reaches puberty, it is common for a married girl to leave her parents to be with her husband. Many marriages are related to poverty, with parents needing the bride price of a daughter to feed, clothe, educate, and house the rest of the family. In Mali, the female-to-male ratio of marriage before age 18 is 72:1; in Kenya, 21:1.

The various reports indicate that in many Sub-Saharan countries, there is a high incidence of marriage among girls younger than 15. Many governments have tended to overlook the particular problems resulting from child marriage, including obstetric fistulae, premature births, stillbirth, sexually transmitted diseases (including cervical cancer), and malaria.

In parts of Ethiopia and Nigeria, many girls are married before the age of 15, some as young as 7. In parts of Mali, 39% of girls are married before the age of 15. In Niger and Chad, over 70% of girls are married before the age of 18. Over fifty million women in Africa were married before the age of 18.

==== The Gambia ====
In 2016, during a feast ending the Muslim holy month of Ramadan, Gambian President Yahya Jammeh announced that child and forced marriages were banned.

==== Kenya ====
In Kenya, 23% of girls are married before age 18, including 4% by age 15.

==== Malawi ====
In 2015, Malawi passed a law banning child marriage, which raises the minimum age for marriage to 18. This major accomplishment came following years of effort by the Girls Empowerment Network campaign, which ultimately led to tribal and traditional leaders banning the cultural practice of child marriage.

==== Morocco ====
In Morocco, child marriage is a common practice. Over 41,000 marriages every year involve child brides. Before 2003, child marriages did not require a court's or state's approval. In 2003, Morocco passed the family law (Moudawana) that raised the minimum age of marriage for girls from 14 to 18, with the exception that underage girls may marry with the permission of the government-recognized official/court and girl's guardian. Over the 10 years preceding 2008, requests for child marriages have been predominantly approved by Morocco's Ministry for Social Development, and have increased (c. 29% of all marriages). Some child marriages in Morocco are a result of Article 475 of the Moroccan penal code, a law that allows rapists to avoid punishment if they marry their underage victims. Article 475 was amended in January 2014 after much campaigning, and rapists can legally no longer avoid sentencing by marrying their victims.

==== Mozambique ====
In 2019, Mozambique's national assembly passed a law prohibiting child marriage. This law came after national movements condemning Mozambique's high rate of child marriage, with 50% of girls marrying under the age of 18.

==== Nigeria ====
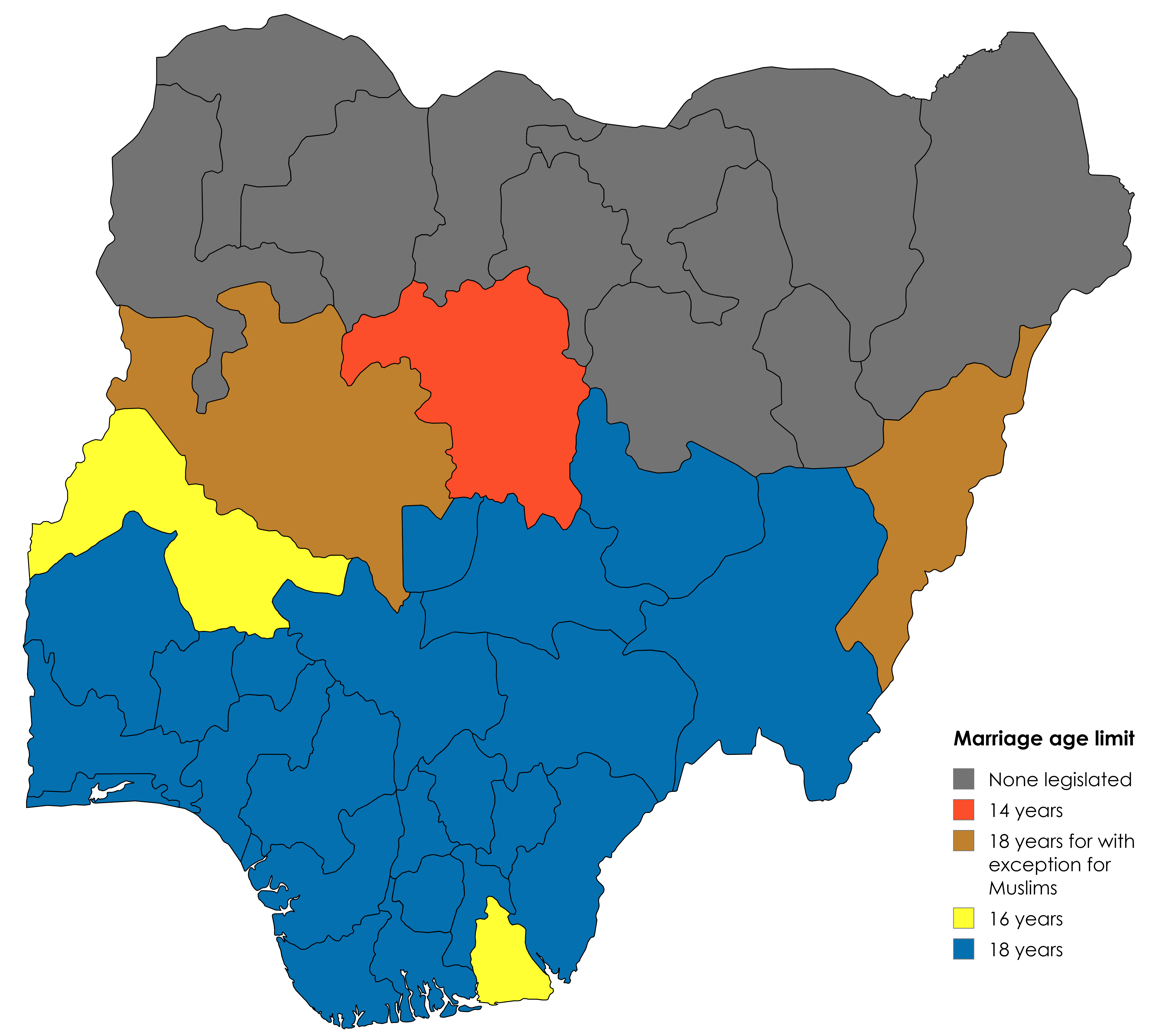
Minimum age of marriage as implemented in different states

As of 2006, 15–20% of school dropouts in Nigeria were the result of child marriage. In 2013, Nigeria attempted to change Section 29, Subsection 4 of its laws and thereby prohibit child marriages. Christianity and Islam are each practiced by roughly half of its population, and the country continues with personal laws from its British colonial-era laws, in which child marriages are forbidden for its Christians and allowed for its Muslims. In Nigeria, child marriage is a divisive topic and widely practiced. In northern states, which are predominantly Muslim, over 50% of the girls marry before the age of 15.

==== South Africa ====
In South Africa, the law provides for respecting the marriage practices of traditional marriages, whereby a person might be married as young as 12 for females and 14 for males. Early marriage is cited as "a barrier to continuing education for girls (and boys)". This includes absuma (arranged marriages set up between cousins at birth in a local Islamic ethnic group), bride kidnapping, and elopement decided on by the children.

==== Tanzania ====
In 2016, the Tanzanian High Court – in a case filed by the Msichana Initiative, a lobbying group that advocates for girls' right to education – ruled in favor of protecting girls from the harms of early marriage. It is now illegal for anyone younger than 18 to marry in Tanzania.

==== Zimbabwe ====
A 2015 Human Rights Watch report stated that in Zimbabwe, one-third of women aged between 20 and 49 years old had married before reaching the age of 18. In January 2016, two women who had been married as children brought a court case requesting a change in the legal age of marriage to the Constitutional Court, with the result that the court declared that 18 is to be the minimum age for a legal marriage for both men and women (previously the legal age had been 16 for women and 18 for men). The law took effect immediately and was hailed by several human rights, women's rights, medical, and legal groups as a landmark ruling for the country.

=== Americas ===
==== Latin America ====
Child marriage is common in Latin America and the Caribbean island nations. About 29% of girls were married before age 18 (as of 2007). The Dominican Republic, Honduras, Brazil, Guatemala, Nicaragua, Haiti, and Ecuador report some of the highest rates in the Americas, while Bolivia and Guyana have shown the sharpest decline in child marriage rates as of 2012. Brazil is ranked fourth in the world in terms of absolute numbers of girls married or cohabitating by age 15.

Poverty and lack of laws mandating minimum age for marriage have been cited as reasons for child marriage in Latin America. In an effort to combat the widespread belief among poor, rural, and indigenous communities that child marriage is a route out of poverty, some NGOs are working with communities in Latin America to shift norms and create safe spaces for adolescent girls.

In Guatemala, early marriage is most common among indigenous Mayan communities. In southeastern Colombia, historically the indigenous Nasa sometimes married at early ages to dissuade colonizers from coercively taking girls. In 2024, Colombia's congress voted to change the minimum age from 14 (with parental consent) to 18.

In 2023, 300,000 girls under the age of 18 were sold into marriage in the Mexican state of Guerrero alone. In 2024, the Mexican Senate voted unanimously to abolish the practices of child marriage in indigenous communities in Mexico, considering children's rights to be more important than tradition and customs.

==== Canada ====
Since 2015-06-18, the minimum marriageable age throughout Canada is 16. In Canada, the age of majority is set by province/territory at 18 or 19, so minors under this age have additional restrictions (i.e. parental and court consent). Under s. 293.2 of the Criminal Code (Marriage under the age of 16 years), "Everyone who celebrates, aids or participates in a marriage rite or ceremony knowing that one of the persons being married is under the age of 16 years is guilty of an indictable offence and liable to imprisonment for a term not exceeding five years." The Civil Marriage Act also states: "2.2 No person who is under the age of 16 years may contract marriage." Before 2015-06-18, it was possible for children less than 16 years old to marry in some jurisdictions of Canada, with parental consent or a court order, and the legal marriage age with parental consent was possibly as low as 7 in some Canadian jurisdictions.

According to a study from McGill University, from 2000 to 2018, 3,600 marriage certificates were issued to children (mostly girls) under 18 in Canada.

==== United States ====
Child marriage, as defined by Committee on the Rights of the Child and UNICEF, is observed in the United States. The UNICEF definition of child marriage includes couples who are formally married, or who live together as a sexually active couple in an informal union, with at least one member – usually the girl – being less than 18 years old. The latter practice is more common in the United States, and it is officially called cohabitation. According to a 2010 report by the United States' National Center for Health Statistics, 2.1% of all girls in the 15–17 age group were either in a child marriage or in an informal union. In the age group of 15–19, 7.6% of all girls in the United States were formally married or in an informal union. The child marriage rates were higher for certain ethnic groups and states. In Hispanic groups, for example, 6.6% of all girls in the 15–17 age group were formally married or in an informal union, and 13% of the 15–19 age group were. Over 350,000 babies are born to teenage mothers every year in the United States, and over 50,000 of these are second babies to teen mothers.

Laws regarding child marriage vary in the different states of the United States. Generally, children 16 and over may marry with parental consent, with the age of 18 being the minimum in all but two states to marry without parental consent. However, all states but 16 have exceptions for child marriage within their laws, and although those under 16 generally require a court order in addition to parental consent, when those exceptions are taken into account, four states have no minimum age requirement. It is the only UN member state that has not yet ratified the Convention on the Rights of the Child.

Until 2008, the Fundamentalist Church of Jesus Christ of Latter Day Saints practiced child marriage through the concept of "spiritual marriage" as soon as it was possible for girls to bear children, as part of its polygamy practice, but laws have raised the age of legal marriage in response to criticism of the practice. In 2007, church leader Warren Jeffs was convicted of being an accomplice to statutory rape of a minor due to arranging a marriage between a 14-year-old girl and a 19-year-old man. In March 2008, officials of the state of Texas believed that children at the Yearning For Zion Ranch were being married to adults and were being abused. The state of Texas removed all 468 children from the ranch and placed them into temporary state custody. After the Austin's 3rd Court of Appeals and the Supreme Court of Texas ruled that Texas acted improperly in removing them from the YFZ Ranch, the children were returned to their parents or relatives. In 2008, the Church changed its policy in the United States to no longer marry individuals younger than the local legal age.

As of June 2024, child marriage is legal in 34 states. Sixteen states have banned underage marriages, with no exception: Delaware, New Jersey, Pennsylvania, Minnesota, Rhode Island, New York, Massachusetts, Vermont, Connecticut, Michigan, Washington, New Hampshire, Virginia, Maine, Oregon and Missouri.

In 2018, Delaware became the first state to ban child marriage without exceptions, followed by New Jersey the same year. Pennsylvania and Minnesota ended child marriage in 2020, followed by Rhode Island and New York in 2021, Massachusetts in 2022, Vermont, Connecticut, and Michigan in 2023, Washington, Virginia and New Hampshire in 2024 and Maine, Oregon, Missouri and Washington, D.C. in 2025.

Between 2000 and 2021, some 315,000 minors were legally married in the United States, some as young as 10. Most child marriages in the US are girls marrying adult men. In fact, many of these marriages occurred at an age or with a spousal age difference that would typically be considered sexual violence.

=== Asia ===
More than half of all child marriages occur in the South Asian countries of India, Pakistan, Bangladesh, and Nepal. There was a decrease in the rates of child marriage across the Indian subcontinent from 1991 to 2007, but the decrease was observed among young adolescent girls and not girls in their late teens. Some scholars believe this age-specific reduction was linked to girls increasingly attending school until about age 15 and then marrying.

A 2013 report claims 53% of all married women in Afghanistan were married before age 18, and 21% of all were married before age 15. Afghanistan's official minimum age of marriage for girls is 15 with her father's permission. In all 34 provinces of Afghanistan, the customary practice of ba'ad is another reason for child marriages; this custom involves village elders, or jirga, settling disputes between families or unpaid debts or ruling punishment for a crime by forcing the guilty family to give their 5- to 12-year-old girls as wives. Sometimes a girl is forced into child marriage for a crime her uncle or distant relative is alleged to have committed. Andrew Bushell claims the rate of marriage of 8- to 13-year-old girls exceeds 50% in Afghan refugee camps along the Pakistan border.

==== Western Asia ====
The widespread prevalence of child marriage in the Kingdom of Saudi Arabia has been documented by human rights groups. Saudi clerics have justified the marriage of girls as young as 9, with sanction from the judiciary. No laws define a minimum age of consent in Saudi Arabia, though drafts for possible laws have been created since 2011. Members of the Saudi Shoura Council in 2019 approved fresh regulations for minor marriages that will outlaw the marrying of 15-year-olds and force the need for court approval for those under 18. Chairman of the Human Rights Committee at the Shoura Council, Dr. Hadi Al-Yami, said that the introduced controls were based on in-depth studies presented to the body. He pointed out that the regulation, vetted by the Islamic Affairs Committee at the Shoura Council, has raised the age of marriage to 18 and prohibited it for those under 15. Saudi Arabia has officially updated the law, banning all marriages under the age of 18.

Research by the United Nations Population Fund indicates that 28.2% of marriages in Turkey – almost one in three – involve girls under 18.

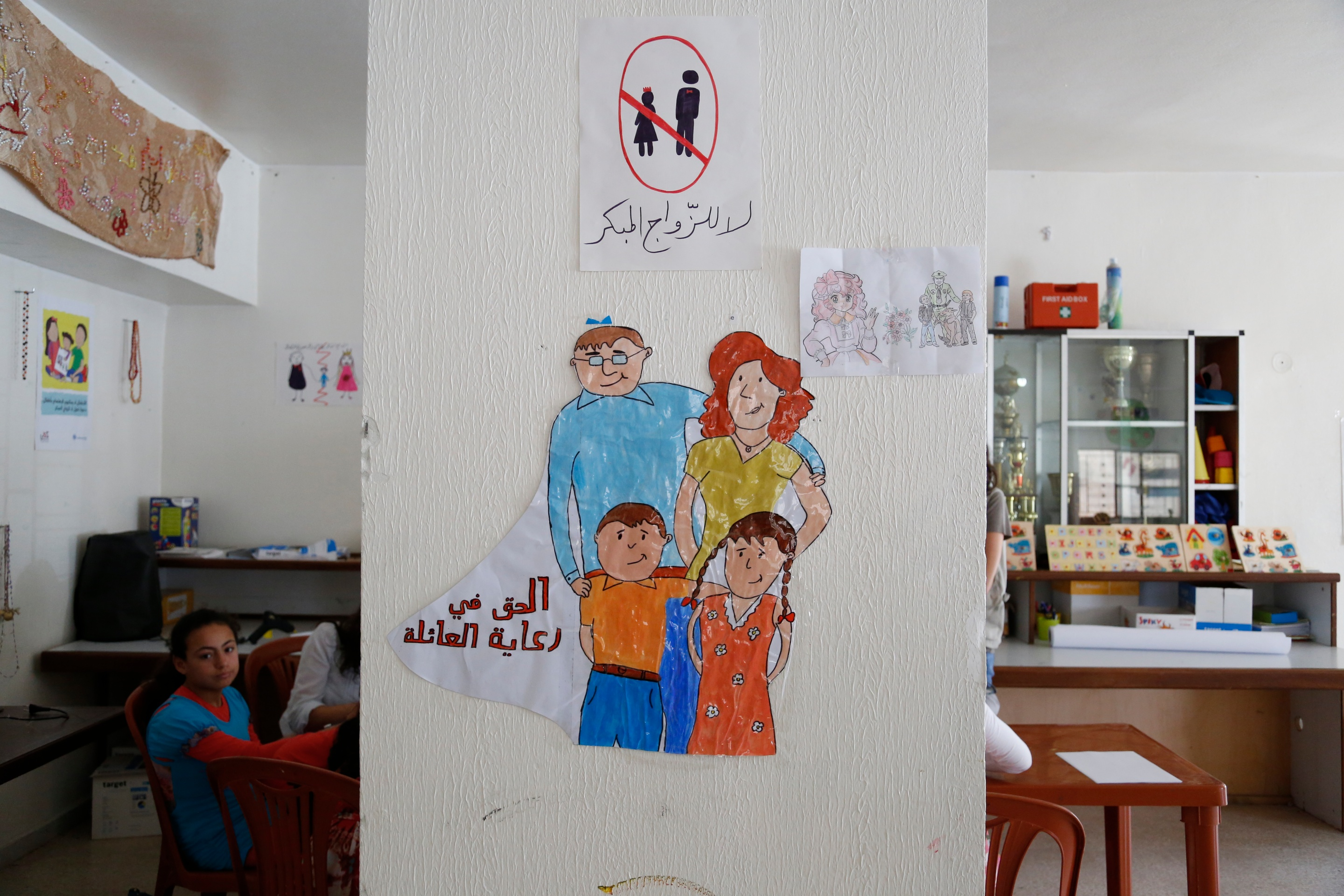
Drawings by young Syrian refugee girls in a community center in southern Lebanon promote the prevention of child marriage.

Child marriage was also found to be prevalent among Syrian and Palestinian-Syrian refugees in Lebanon, in addition to other forms of sexual and gender-based violence. Marriage was seen as a potential way to protect family honor and protect a girl from rape, given how common rape was during the conflict. Incidents of child marriages increased in Syria and among Syrian refugees over the course of the conflict. The proportion of Syrian refugee girls living in Jordan who were married increased from 13% in 2011 to 32% in 2014. Journalists Magnus Wennman and Carina Bergfeldt documented the practice, and some of its results. According to UNICEF, 28% of women in Iraq were married before the age of 18.

==== Southeast Asia ====
Hill tribe girls are often married young. For the Karen people, it is possible that two couples can arrange their children's marriage before the children are born.

==== Indonesia ====
In a move to curb child marriage in Indonesia, the minimum marriage age for girls in Indonesia was raised to 19 in 2019, equalizing it to that of males. Previously, under the 1974 marriage law, the marriage age for girls was 16, and there was no minimum with judicial consent.

There has been an increase in underage marriage which has been attributed to a rise in social networking sites like Facebook. It has been reported that in areas like Gunung Kidul, Yogyakarta, couples become acquainted through Facebook and continue their relationships until girls become pregnant. Under Indonesian law, underage marriage is prosecuted as sexual abuse, though unregistered marriages between young girls and older men are common in rural areas. In one case that caused a nationwide outcry, a wealthy Muslim cleric married a 12-year-old girl. He was prosecuted for sexually abusing a minor and sentenced to four years in jail.

Among the Aceh of Sumatra, girls formerly married before puberty. The husbands, though usually older, were still unfit for sexual union.

==== Malaysia ====
The current laws involving child marriage are very complex in Malaysia, primarily due to conflicts between the beliefs of the government and those disposed by the religious teachings of Islam.

A 41-year-old Malaysian man married an 11-year-old girl in Golok, a border town in southern Thailand, in June 2018, according to information made public in Malaysia. The man was the imam of a surau in a hamlet near Gua Musang, Kelantan, and he already had two wives and six children. The girl's parents defended their choice to consent to the marriage.

In response to this incident, Deputy Prime Minister Datuk Seri Wan Azizah Wan Ismail said that the marriage remained valid under Islam. She also said in a press statement that "the Malaysian government 'unequivocally' opposes child marriages and is already taking steps to raise the minimum age of marriage to 18".

Minister in the Prime Minister's Department, Datuk Mujahid Yusof Rawa, proposed a blanket ban on marriages involving minors. In response, PAS Vice President Datuk Mohd Amar Nik Abdullah said that imposing a blanket ban on child marriage contradicts Islamic religious teachings and could not be accepted. He also said it would be better to enforce existing laws to protect children from being forced into early marriages.

In July 2018, another case of a child bride was reported in Malaysia, involving a 19-year-old man from Terengganu and a 13-year-old girl from Kelantan.

In August 2018, Selangor announced plans for an amendment to the Islamic Family Law (State of Selangor) Enactment 2003 which would raise the minimum age of marriage for Muslim women from 16 to 18 years.

Another child marriage case was covered by the media in September 2018.

Malaysia planned to tighten the requirements for child marriages in 2019. Subsequently, any marriage with minors would have to go through a stringent approval process involving Shariah Court Department, the Home Ministry, State Religious Council, and Customary Courts.

==== Philippines ====
In December 2021, President Rodrigo Duterte signed a law criminalizing child marriage, including its facilitation and solemnization, and cohabitation of an adult with a child outside wedlock.

Before the law change, the legal age for marriage was 18 for most Filipinos; however, Muslim Filipino boys were able to marry from age 15, and Muslim girls from puberty.

According to UNICEF, 15% of Filipino girls were married before age 18, and 2% were married by age 15, mostly in the Moro and Indigenous-dominated region.

==== Bangladesh ====
Child marriage rates in Bangladesh are amongst the highest in the world. Every 2 out of 3 marriages involve child marriages. According to statistics from 2005, 49% of women then between 25 and 29 were married by the age of 15 in Bangladesh. According to a 2008 study, for each additional year a girl in rural Bangladesh is not married she will attend school an additional 0.22 years on average. The later girls were married, the more likely they were to utilize preventive health care. Married girls in the region were found to have less influence on family planning, higher rates of maternal mortality, and lower status in their husband's family than girls who married later. Another study found that women who married at age 18 or older were less likely to experience IPV (intimate partner violence) than those married before age 18. It also found that girls married before age 15 were at an even higher risk for IPV.

==== India ====
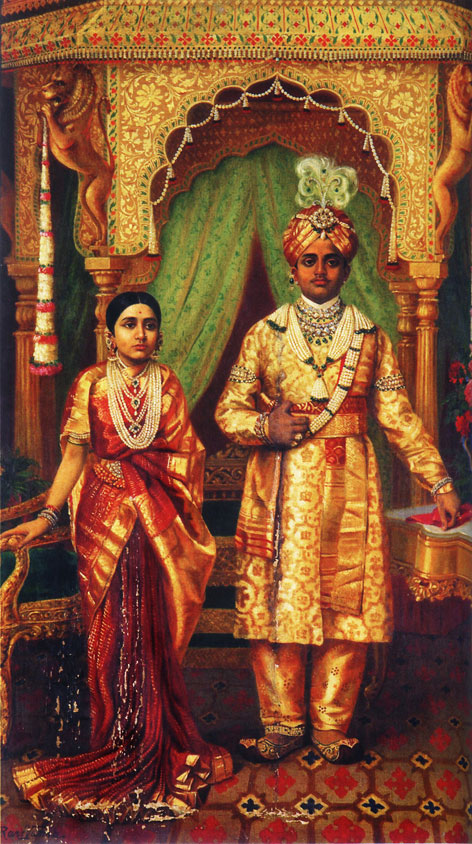
In 1900, Rana Prathap Kumari, aged 12, married Krishnaraja Wadiyar IV, aged 16. Two years later, he was recognized as the Maharaja of Mysore under British India.

According to UNICEF's "State of the World's Children-2009" report, 47% of India's women aged 20–24 married before the legal age of 18, with 56% marrying before age 18 in rural areas. The report also showed that 40% of the world's child marriages occur in India. As with Africa, this UNICEF report is based on data that is derived from a small sample survey in 1999. The latest available UNICEF report for India uses 2004–2005 household survey data, on a small sample, and other scholars report lower incidence rates for India. According to Raj et al., the 2005 small sample household survey data suggests 22% of girls ever married aged 16–18, 20% of girls in India married between 13 and 16, and 2.6% married before age 13. According to 2011 nationwide census of India, the average age of marriage for women in India is 21. The child marriage rates in India, according to a 2009 representative survey, dropped to 7%. In its 2001 demographic report, the Census of India stated zero married girls below age 10, 1.4 million married girls out of 59.2 million girls in the age 10–14, and 11.3 million married girls out of 46.3 million girls in the age 15–19 (which includes 18–19 age group). For 2011, the Census of India reports child marriage rates dropping further to 3.7% of females aged less than 18 being married.

The Child Marriage Restraint Act, 1929 was passed during the tenure of British rule on Colonial India. It forbade the marriage of a male younger than 21 or a female younger than 18 for Hindus, Buddhists, Christians, and most people of India. However, this law did not and currently does not apply to India's 165 million Muslim population, and only applies to India's Hindu, Christian, Jain, Sikh, and other religious minorities. This link of law and religion was formalized by the British colonial rule with the Muslim personal laws codified in the Indian Muslim Personal Law (Shariat) Application Act of 1937. The age at which India's Muslim girls can legally marry, according to this Muslim Personal Law, is 9, and can be lower if her guardian (wali) decides she is sexually mature. Over the last 25 years, All India Muslim Personal Law Board and other Muslim civil organizations have actively opposed India-wide laws and enforcement action against child marriages; they have argued that Indian Muslim families have a religious right to marry a girl aged 15 or even 12. Several states of India claim specially high child marriage rates in their Muslim and tribal communities. India, with a population of over 1.2 billion, has the world's highest total number of child marriages. It is a significant social issue. As of 2016, the situation has been legally rectified by the Prohibition of Child Marriage Act, 2006.

According to the "National Plan of Action for Children 2005", published by Indian government's Department of Women and Child Development, set a goal to eliminate child marriage completely by 2010. In 2006, The Prohibition of Child Marriage Act, 2006 was passed to prohibit solemnization of child marriages. This law states that men must be at least 21 years of age and women must be at least 18 years of age to marry.

Some Muslim organizations planned to challenge the new law in the Supreme Court of India. In latter years, various high courts in India – including the Gujarat High Court, the Karnataka High Court and the Madras High Court – have ruled that the act prevails over any personal law (including Muslim personal law).

==== Nepal ====
UNICEF reported that 28.8% of marriages in Nepal were child marriages as of 2011. A UNICEF discussion paper determined that 79.6 percent of Muslim girls in Nepal, 69.7 percent of girls living in hilly regions irrespective of religion, and 55.7 percent of girls living in other rural areas, are all married before the age of 15. Girls born into the highest wealth quintile marry about two years later than those from the other quintiles.

==== Pakistan ====
According to a UNICEF report from 2018, around 18% of the girls in Pakistan were married before the age of 18 and 4% of the girls were married before the age of 15. In the past two 2013 reports suggest that over 50% of all marriages in Pakistan involve girls less than 18 years old.

The exact number of child marriages in Pakistan below the age of 13 is unknown, but rising according to the United Nations.

Another custom in Pakistan, called swara or vani, involves village elders solving family disputes or settling unpaid debts by marrying off girls. The average marriage age of swara girls is between 5 and 9. Similarly, the custom of watta satta has been cited as a cause of child marriages in Pakistan.

According to Population Council, 35% of all females in Pakistan become mothers before they reach the age of 18, and 67% have experienced pregnancy – 69% of these have given birth – before they reach the age of 19. Less than 4% of married girls below the age of 19 had some say in choosing her spouse; over 80% were married to a near or distant relative. Child marriage and early motherhood is common in Pakistan.

==== Iran ====
In Iran, as in other developing societies, the phenomenon of child marriage, or early child marriage, is widespread. According to the official statistics of Iran in 2013, as many as 187,000 marriages of children under the legal age were registered with the country's Civil Registration Organization. The vice president of prevention of social harms of the government's welfare organization stated that, in 2016, 17% of girls’ marriages in Iran took place before they reached the age of 18. The border provinces of Khorasan Razavi, East Azerbaijan, and Sistan and Baluchistan are the three provinces where the highest number of child marriages occur.

Though the legal age of marriage in Iran is 13 years for girls and 15 for boys, there are cases of girls below the age of 10 being married. The same source pointed out that "child marriages are more common in socially backward rural areas often afflicted with high levels of illiteracy and drug addiction". In October 2019, a prosecutor annulled the marriage of an 11-year-old girl to her adult cousin in rural Iran, and said he was indicting the mullah (officiant) and the girl's parents for an illegal underage marriage. According to the Iranian Students News Agency, nearly 6,000 children are married each year in Iran.

The UN Committee on the Rights of the Child (CRC) examining child marriage in Iran has warned of a rising number of young girls forced into marriage in Iran. The Committee deplored the fact that the State party allows sexual intercourse involving girls as young as 9 lunar years and that other forms of sexual abuse of even younger children is not criminalized. CRC said that Tehran must "repeal all provisions that authorize, condone or lead to child sexual abuse" and called for the age of sexual consent to be increased from nine years old to 16. The Society For Protecting The Rights of The Child said that 43,459 girls aged under 15 married in 2009. In 2010, 716 girls under the age of 10 married, up from 449 in the year prior. On 8 March 2018 a member of the Tehran City Council, Shahrbanoo Amani said that there were 15,000 widows under the age of 15 in the country.

The Iranian Government has been criticized by the international community over its high rate of child marriage.

In August 2019, Iran demonstrated its sensitivity towards its birth rates by arresting Kameel Ahmady, an expert in the area of child marriage, and sentencing him to a nine-year and three-month imprisonment for alleged "subversive research." Ahmady's research focuses on harmful traditional practices such as early child marriage, female genital mutilation (FGM), sexuality and the LGBTQ+ community, child labour and ethnic issues. His group fieldwork research on child marriage, carried out in 2017 and published under the title An Echo of Silence: A Comprehensive Research Study on Early Child Marriage (ECM) in Iran, brought him to the attention of the authorities because they believed he was campaigning to raise the legal age of marriage for girls.

==== Yemen ====
Child marriage is a common practice in Yemen, both in urban and rural areas. As of 2023, an estimated 3.8 million Yemeni girls (about 30%) are married before the age of 18, with approximately 1.3 million girls (about 7%) married before the age of 15.

According to Human Rights Watch (HRW), in 1999 the minimum marriage age 15 for women was abolished; the onset of puberty, interpreted by conservatives to be at age nine, was set as a requirement for consummation of marriage. In April 2008, Nujood Ali, a 10-year-old girl, successfully obtained a divorce after being raped under these conditions. Her case prompted calls to raise the legal age for marriage to 18. Later in 2008, the Supreme Council for Motherhood and Childhood proposed to define the minimum age for marriage at 18 years, the law passed in April 2009 with the age voted for as 17, however due to maneuvers by opposing parliamentarians the law was dropped the next day.

Since 2014 the Yemeni civil war has led to severe disruption of economic, social and political systems. Extreme poverty drives many families in Yemen to marry off their daughters for financial relief, receiving a dowry in exchange, or sometimes to ensure the safety of girls in an unstable environment. Limited access to education leaves young girls with limited options, as child marriage rates are significantly higher among uneducated girls (39.5%) compared to those with secondary education (22.3%). Houthi laws and policies have also forced the closure of several civil and human rights organisations and also further restricted access to education, indirectly increasing child marriage rates.

=== Europe ===
==== General ====
Each European country has its own laws; in both the European Union and the Council of Europe the marriageable age falls within the jurisdiction of individual member states. The Istanbul convention, the first legally binding instrument in Europe in the field of violence against women and domestic violence, only requires countries which ratify it to prohibit forced marriage (Article 37) and to ensure that forced marriages can be easily voided without further victimization (Article 32), but does not make any reference to a minimum age of marriage.

==== European Union ====
In the European Union, the general age of marriage as a right is 18 in all member states. When all exceptions are taken into account (such as judicial or parental consent), the minimum age is 16 in most countries. In 7 countries marriage under 18 is completely prohibited. By contrast, in 6 countries there is no set minimum age, although all these countries require the authorization of a public authority (such as a judge or social worker) for the marriage to take place.

| State | Minimum age | | Notes |
| State | Minimum age when all exceptions are taken into account | General age | Notes |
|---|---|---|---|
| Austria | 18 | 18 | Since 2025 child marriage is prohibited. |
| Belgium | none | 18 | Younger than 18 and only after judicial consent (with no strict minimum age). With parental consent, serious reasons are required for a minor to obtain judicial consent for a marriage; without parental consent, serious reasons are required and the unwillingness of the parents has to constitute an abuse. |
| Bulgaria | 18 | 18 | Since 2023 18 without exceptions. The new 2009 Family Code fixes the age at 18, but allows for an exception for 16 years olds, stating that "Upon exception, in case that important reasons impose this, matrimony may be concluded by a person at the age of 16 with permission by the regional judge". It further states that both persons wanting to marry, as well as the parents/guardians of the minor, must be consulted by the judge. (Chapter 2, Article 6) |
| Croatia | 16 | 18 | 16 with judicial consent. |
| Cyprus | 16 | 18 | 16 with parental consent, if there are serious reasons for the marriage. |
| Czech Republic | 16 | 18 | Article 672 of Act No. 89/2012 Coll. the Civil Code (which came into force in 2014) states that the court may, in exceptional cases, allow a marriage of a 16-year-old, if there are serious reasons for it. |
| Denmark | 18 | 18 | Since 2017, marriage is no longer allowed under 18. |
| Estonia | 18 | 18 | Since 2022, marriage under 18 is prohibited. |
| Finland | 18 | 18 | Under 18 marriages with judicial authorization were banned in 2019. |
| France | none | 18 | Under 18 needs judicial authorization. |
| Germany | 18/unclear | 18 | The minimum age was set at 18 in 2017. In 2023, the German Federal Constitutional Court ruled this law in parts unconstitutional. |
| Greece | none | 18 | Under 18 requires court permission, which may be given if there are serious reasons for such a marriage |
| Hungary | 16 | 18 | 16 with authorization from the guardianship authority |
| Ireland | 18 | 18 | Since 2019, marriage under 18 is banned. |
| Italy | 16 | 18 | 16 with court consent. |
| Latvia | 16 | 18 | 16 with court consent. |
| Lithuania | none girls/15 boys | 18 | 15 with court permission. Girls can marry below 15 with court permission if they are pregnant. |
| Luxembourg | none | 18 | Under 18 need judicial permission. New laws of 2014 fixed the marriageable at 18 for both sexes; prior to these regulations the age was 16 for females and 18 for males. The new laws still allow both sexes to obtain judicial consent to get married under 18. |
| Malta | 16 | 18 | 16 with parental consent. |
| Netherlands | 18 | 18 | Exceptions were removed by a change in the law in 2015. |
| Poland | 16 girls/18 boys | 18 | 16 for girls with court consent. |
| Portugal | 18 | 18 | Since 2025, marriage of minors is prohibited. |
| Romania | 16 | 18 | 16, if there are valid reasons, with both judicial and parental permission, as well as medical approval. |
| Slovakia | 16 | 18 | 16 with court consent, with a serious reason such as pregnancy. |
| Slovenia | none | 18 | Under 18 may be approved by the Social Work Centre if there are "well founded reasons" arising upon the investigation of the situation of the minor. (Art 23, 24 of the Law on Marriage and Family Relations). |
| Spain | 16 | 18 | 16 with court consent. |
| Sweden | 18 | 18 | Not possible to marry under the age of 18 for Swedish citizens since 1 July 2014. Authorities take a different approach to individuals who were already married when they arrived in Sweden, as during the European migrant crisis, the Swedish Migration Agency identified 132 married children, of which 65 were in Malmö. |

==== Scandinavia ====
In April 2016, Reuters reported "Child brides sometimes tolerated in Nordic asylum centers despite bans". For example, at least 70 girls under 18 were living as married couples in Sweden; in Norway, "some" under 16 lived "with their partners". In Denmark, it was determined there were "dozens of cases of girls living with older men", prompting immigration minister Inger Støjberg to state she would "stop housing child brides in asylum centers".

Marriage under 18 was completely banned in Sweden in 2014, in Denmark in 2017, and in Finland in 2019.

==== Balkans/Eastern Europe ====
In these areas, child and forced marriages are associated with the Roma community and with some rural populations. However, such marriages are illegal in most of the countries from that area. In recent years, many of those countries have taken steps in order to curb these practices, including equalizing the marriageable age of both sexes (e.g. Romania in 2007, Ukraine in 2012). Therefore, most of those 'marriages' are informal unions (without legal recognition) and often arranged from very young ages. Such practices are common in Serbia, Bulgaria and Romania (in these countries the marriageable age is 18, and can only be lowered to 16 in special circumstances with judicial approval). A 2003 case involving the daughter of an informal 'gypsy king' of the area has made international news.

==== Belgium ====
The Washington Post reported in April 2016 that "17 child brides" arrived in Belgium in 2015 and a further 7 so far in 2016. The same report added that "Between 2010 and 2013, the police registered at least 56 complaints about a forced marriage."

==== Germany ====
In 2016 there were 1475 underage foreigners in Germany registered as married, of which 1100 were girls. Syrians represented 664, Afghans 157 and Iraqis 100. In July 2016, 361 foreign children under 14 were registered as married.

==== Netherlands ====
The Dutch government's National Rapporteur on Trafficking in Human Beings and Sexual Violence against Children wrote that "between September 2015 and January 2016 around 60 child brides entered the Netherlands". At least one was 14 years old. The Washington Post reported that asylum centers in the Netherlands were "housing 20 child brides between ages 13 and 15" in 2015.

==== Russia ====
The common marriageable age established by the Family Code of Russia is 18 years old. Marriages of persons at age from 16 to 18 years are allowed only with good reasons and by local municipal authority permission. Marriage before 16 years old may be allowed by federal subject of Russia law as an exception just in special circumstances.

By 2016, a minimum age for marriage in special circumstances had been established at 14 years (in Adygea, Kaluga Oblast, Magadan Oblast, Moscow Oblast, Nizhny Novgorod Oblast, Novgorod Oblast, Oryol Oblast, Sakhalin Oblast, Tambov Oblast, Tatarstan, Vologda Oblast) or to 15 years (in Murmansk Oblast and Ryazan Oblast). Others subjects of Russia also can have marriageable age laws.

Abatement of marriageable age is an ultimate measure acceptable in cases of life threat, pregnancy, and childbirth.

==== United Kingdom ====
Since 1 May 2022, the marriageable age in both England and Wales is 18 with no exemptions (16 with consent of both parents or guardians, plus also a magistrate approval required within Northern Ireland only), although in Scotland no parental consent is required over 16. Scotland and Andorra are the only European jurisdictions where 16-year-olds can marry as a right (i.e. without parental or court approval); see Marriageable age § Europe.

According to a 2004 report in The Guardian, girls as young as 12 have been smuggled into the UK to be the brides of men in the Muslim community. Girls trying to escape this child marriage can face death because this breaks the honor code of her husband and both families.

As with the United States, underage cohabitation is observed in the United Kingdom. According to a 2005 study, 4.1% of all girls in the 15–19 age group in the UK were cohabiting (living in an informal union), while 8.9% of all girls in that age group admitted to having been in a cohabitation relation (child marriage per UNICEF definition), before the age of 18. Over 4% of all underage girls in the UK were teenage mothers.

In July 2014, the United Kingdom hosted its first global Girl Summit; the goal of the Summit was to increase efforts to end child, early, and forced marriage, as well as female genital mutilation within a generation.

== Consequences ==
Birth rates per 1,000 women aged 15–19 years, worldwide

Child marriage has consequences that last well beyond adolescence. Women married as children struggle with the impact of pregnancy at a young age on the body, often with little spacing between children. Early marriages followed by teen pregnancy also significantly increase birth complications and social isolation. In poor countries, early pregnancy limits or can even eliminate a woman's education options, affecting her economic independence. Girls in child marriages are more likely to suffer from domestic violence, child sexual abuse, and marital rape.

=== Health ===
Child marriage threatens the health and life of girls. Complications from pregnancy and childbirth are the main cause of death among adolescent girls below age 19 in developing countries. Girls aged 15 to 19 are twice as likely to die in childbirth as fully-grown women in their 20s, and girls under the age of 15 are five to seven times more likely to die during childbirth. These consequences are due largely to girls' physical immaturity wherefore the pelvis and birth canal are not fully developed. Teen pregnancy, particularly below age 15, increases risk of developing an obstetric fistula, since their smaller pelvises make them prone to obstructed labor. Girls who give birth before the age of 15 have an 88% risk of developing a fistula, and those between 15 and 18 have a 25% chance. Fistulas can cause urine or fecal incontinence that causes lifelong complications with infection and pain. Unless surgically repaired, obstetric fistulas can cause years of permanent disability and shame to mothers, and can result in being shunned by the community. Married girls also have a higher risk of sexually transmitted infections, cervical cancer, and malaria than non-married peers or girls who marry in their 20s.

Child marriage also threatens the lives of offspring. Mothers under the age of 18 years have 35 to 55% increased risk of delivering pre-term or having a low birth weight baby than a mother who is 19 or 20 years old. In addition, infant mortality rates are 60% higher when the mother is under 18 years old. Infants born to child mothers tend to have weaker immune systems and face a heightened risk of malnutrition.

Prevalence of child marriage may also be associated with higher rates of population growth, more cases of children left orphaned, and the accelerated spread of disease which for many translates into prolonged poverty.

=== Illiteracy and poverty ===
Child marriage often ends a girl's education, particularly in impoverished countries where child marriages are common. In addition, uneducated girls are more at risk for child marriage. Girls who have only a primary education are twice as likely to marry before age 18 than those with a secondary or higher education, and girls with no education are three times more likely to marry before age 18 than those with a secondary education. Early marriage impedes a young girl's ability to continue with her education as most drop out of school following marriage to focus their attention on domestic duties and having or raising children. Girls may be taken out of school years before they are married due to family or community beliefs that allocating resources for girls' education is unnecessary given that her primary roles will be that of wife and mother. Without education, girls and adult women have fewer opportunities to earn an income and financially provide for themselves and their children. This makes girls more vulnerable to persistent poverty if their spouses die, abandon them, or divorce them. Given that girls in child marriages are often significantly younger than their husbands, they become widowed earlier in life and may face associated economic and social challenges for a greater portion of their life than women who marry later.

=== Domestic violence ===
Married teenage girls with low levels of education suffer greater risk of social isolation and domestic violence than more educated women who marry as adults. Following marriage, girls frequently relocate to their husband's home and take on the domestic role of being a wife, which often involves relocating to another village or area. This transition may result in a young girl dropping out of school, moving away from her family and friends, and a loss of the social support that she once had. A husband's family may also have higher expectations for the girl's submissiveness to her husband and his family because of her youth. This sense of isolation from a support system can have severe mental health implications including depression.

Large age gaps between the child and her spouse make her more vulnerable to domestic violence and marital rape. Girls who marry as children face severe and life-threatening marital violence at higher rates. Husbands in child marriages are often more than ten years older than their wives. This can increase the power and control a husband has over his wife and contribute to prevalence of spousal violence. Early marriage places young girls in a vulnerable situation of being completely dependent on her husband. Domestic and sexual violence from their husbands has lifelong, devastating mental health consequences for young girls because they are at a formative stage of psychological development. These mental health consequences of spousal violence can include depression and suicidal thoughts. Child brides, particularly in situations such as vani, also face social isolation, emotional abuse and discrimination in the homes of their husbands and in-laws.

=== Women's rights ===
The United Nations, through a series of conventions has declared child marriage a violation of human rights. The Convention on the Elimination of all Forms of Discrimination of Women (CEDAW), the Committee on the Rights of the Child (CRC), and the Universal Declaration of Human Rights form the international standard against child marriage. Child marriage violates a range of women's interconnected rights such as equality on grounds of sex and age, to receive the highest attainable standard of health, to be free from slavery, access to education, freedom of movement, freedom from violence, reproductive rights, and the right to consensual marriage. The consequence of these violations affect women, their children, and the broader society.

=== Development ===
High rates of child marriage negatively impact countries' economic development because of early marriages' impact on girls' education and labor market participation. Some researchers and activists note that high rates of child marriage prevent significant progress toward each of the eight Millennium Development Goals and global efforts to reduce poverty due to its effects on educational attainment, economic and political participation, and health.

A UNICEF Nepal issued report noted that child marriage impacts Nepal's development due to loss of productivity, poverty, and health effects. Using Nepal Multi-Indicator Survey data, its researchers estimate that all girls delaying marriage until age 20 and after would increase cash flow among Nepali women in an amount equal to 3.87% of the country's GDP. Their estimates considered decreased education and employment among girls in child marriages in addition to low rates of education and high rates of poverty among children from child marriages.

== Divorce ==
Divorce in the case of child marriage is more difficult because in some places minors aren't old enough to file for divorce. The law often does not provide clear guidance for married minors because divorce law is written with the assumption that the people who are married are adults. In these places, minors need permission from a judge to participate in their divorce proceedings, or they need an adult guardian ad litem to advocate for them. Some places, such as New York state, have recently modified their divorce laws so that a minor can initiate a divorce themselves, without a guardian ad litem.

== Prevention ==
Child marriage is always forced marriage, according to the OHCHR, because children cannot give full informed consent to marriage. Many organizations offer ways to help prevent child marriage and forced marriage.

=== For children ===
Child marriage is illegal in many places; however, children who have been forced into marriage have not broken the law. There are organizations that offer help, such as housing and legal aid, to children who are trying to escape or prevent a marriage.

==== In the United States ====
A child who has been forced into a marriage has not broken any laws in the United States and is not at fault. The US government is opposed to child marriage, and offers legal help and social services to children who have been forced to marry. Children in the United States who need to prevent or leave a forced marriage can call the National Domestic Violence Hotline. They can also reach out to Unchained At Last, a survivor-led nonprofit organization dedicated to ending forced and child marriage in the United States through direct services and systems change. Unchained provides crucial legal and social services, always for free, to help people in the U.S. to escape arranged/forced/child marriages and rebuild their lives.

Within the United States, each state and territory and the federal district set the marriage age in its jurisdiction. As of March 2024, in four states there is no statutory minimum age when all exemptions are taken into account. These states are California, Mississippi, New Mexico, and Oklahoma.

As of June 2024, 16 states have banned underage marriages, with no exception: Delaware (2018), New Jersey (2018), Pennsylvania (2020), Minnesota (2020), Rhode Island (2021), New York (2021), Massachusetts (2022), Vermont (2023), Connecticut (2023), Michigan (2023), Washington (2024), Virginia (2024), New Hampshire (2024), Maine (2025), Oregon (2025) and Missouri (2025). American Samoa and U.S. Virgin Islands, both United States territories, have also ended child marriage in that time, as has Washington, D.C. Several other U.S. states have similar legislation pending.

==== In Europe ====
In the United Kingdom, when anything is done to make someone marry before they turn 18 the government of the UK considers this to be a forced marriage, which is unlawful. The Forced Marriage Unit offers help to children facing it.

In the Netherlands, the minimum age to marry is 18. Forcing someone to marry is unlawful, even if the marriage took place outside the Netherlands. Children who have been forced to marry may contact National Expertise Centre on Forced Marriage and Abandonment for help.

==== In Africa ====
In June 2024, the Sierra Leone Parliament passed the Prohibition of Child Marriage Bill 2024, which makes marrying or cohabitating with anyone under 18 years old illegal, with a punishment of 15 years in prison or a large fine. The bill was signed into law in July 2024.

=== International initiatives ===
In December 2011 a resolution adopted by the United Nations General Assembly (A/RES/66/170) designated 11 October as the International Day of the Girl Child. On 11 October 2012 the first International Day of the Girl Child was held, the theme of which was ending child marriage.

In 2013 the first United Nations Human Rights Council resolution against child, early, and forced marriages was adopted; it recognizes child marriage as a human rights violation and pledges to eliminate the practice as part of the UN's post-2015 global development agenda.

In 2014 the UN's Commission on the Status of Women issued a document in which they agreed, among other things, to eliminate child marriage.

The World Health Organization recommends increased educational attainment among girls, increased enforcement structures for existing minimum marriage age laws, and informing parents in practicing communities of the risks associated as primary methods to prevent child marriages.

Programs to prevent child marriage have taken several different approaches. Various initiatives have aimed to empower young girls, educate parents on the associated risks, change community perceptions, support girls' education, and provide economic opportunities for girls and their families through means other than marriage. A survey of a variety of prevention programs found that initiatives were most effective when they combined efforts to address financial constraints, education, and limited employment of women.

Girls in families participating in an unconditional cash transfer program in Malawi aimed at incentivizing girls' education married and had children later than their peers who had not participated in the program. The program's effects on rates of child marriage were greater for unconditional cash transfer programs than those with conditions. Evaluators believe this demonstrated that the economic needs of the family heavily influenced the appeal of child marriage in this community. Therefore, reducing financial pressures on the family decreased the economic motivations to marry daughters off at a young age.

The Haryana state government in India operated a program in which poor families were given a financial incentive if they kept their daughters in school and unmarried until age 18. Girls in families who were eligible for the program were less likely to be married before age 18 than their peers.

A similar program was operated in 2004 by the Population Council and the regional government in Ethiopia's rural Amhara Region. Families received cash if their daughters remained in school and unmarried during the two years of the program. They also instituted mentorship programs, livelihood training, community conversations about girls' education and child marriage, and gave school supplies for girls. After the two-year program, girls in families eligible for the program were three times more likely to be in school and one tenth as likely to be married compared to their peers.

The Global Campaign for the Prevention of Child Marriage (GCPCM) was launched in March 2019. Its primary goal is raising awareness and addressing child marriage in the world.

Other programs have addressed child marriage less directly through a variety of programming related to girls' empowerment, education, sexual and reproductive health, financial literacy, life skills, communication skills, and community mobilization.

In 2018, UN Women announced that Jaha Dukureh would serve as Goodwill Ambassador in Africa to help organize to prevent child marriage.

In September 2026, the United Nations General Assembly adopted by consensus resolution A/RES/80/309, proclaiming 27 November of each year as the International Day for the Elimination of Child, Early and Forced Marriage. The resolution was led by Sierra Leone, with First Lady Fatima Maada Bio playing a prominent advocacy role, and was co-sponsored by more than 60 Member States, including India. It aims to strengthen global awareness, political commitment, and concrete action to end child, early and forced marriage, in support of Sustainable Development Goal target 5.3.

==== Tipping point analysis ====
Researchers at the International Center for Research on Women found that in some communities rates of child marriage increase significantly when girls are a particular age. This "tipping point", or age at which rates of marriage increase dramatically, may occur years before the median age of marriage. Therefore, the researchers argue prevention programs should focus their programming on girls who are pre-tipping point age rather than only on girls who are married before they reach the median age for marriage.

== Prevalence data ==
Prevalence data by country
| Country | % Females married < 18 | Year of assessment | Article | Ref |
|---|---|---|---|---|
| Afghanistan | 28% | 2017 | Child marriage in Afghanistan | |
| Angola | 30% | 2017 | Child marriage in Angola | |
| Bangladesh | 59% | 2018 | Child marriage in Bangladesh | |
| Burkina Faso | 52% | 2018 | Child marriage in Burkina Faso | |
| Central African Republic | 68% | 2018 | Child marriage in the Central African Republic | |
| Chad | 67% | 2017 | | |
| Cameroon | 31% | 2017 | Child marriage in Cameroon | |
| Republic of the Congo | 33% | 2017 | Child marriage in Republic of the Congo | |
| Democratic Republic of the Congo | 37% | 2017 | Child marriage in Democratic Republic of the Congo | |
| Eritrea | 41% | 2018 | | |
| Ethiopia | 40% | 2017 | Child marriage in Ethiopia | |
| India | 27% | 2015–16 | Child marriage in India | |
| Ivory Coast | 27% | 2017 | Child marriage in Ivory Coast | |
| Nepal | 40% | 2018 | | |
| Niger | 76% | 2018 | | |
| Nigeria | 43% | 2017 | Child marriage in Nigeria | |
| Malawi | 42% | 2018 | | |
| Madagascar | 41% | 2018 | | |
| Mali | 52% | 2017 | Child marriage in Mali | |
| Mauritania | 37% | 2018 | | |
| Mozambique | 48% | 2018 | | |
| Pakistan | 18% | 2018 | Child marriage in Pakistan | |
| Senegal | 31% | 2017 | | |
| Sierra Leone | 39% | 2018 | | |
| Somalia | 36% | 2020 | Child marriage in Somalia | |
| South Sudan | 52% | 2017 | Child marriage in South Sudan | |
| Uganda | 40% | 2018 | | |
| Zimbabwe | 32% | 2017 | Child marriage in Zimbabwe | |

| Country | % males married <18 | Year assessed |
|---|---|---|
| Albania | 1.2 | 2018 |
| Angola | 6 | 2016 |
| Armenia | 0.4 | 2016 |
| Benin | 4.8 | 2018 |
| Belize | 22.2 | 2016 |
| Bolivia | 5.2 | 2016 |
| Burundi | 1.4 | 2017 |
| Ethiopia | 5 | 2016 |
| Haiti | 1.6 | 2017 |
| India | 4.2 | 2016 |
| Ivory Coast | 3.5 | 2016 |
| Laos | 10.8 | 2017 |
| Nepal | 10.3 | 2016 |
| Nigeria | 3 | 2017 |
| Senegal | 0.6 | 2017 |
| Sierra Leone | 6.5 | 2017 |
| Timor-Leste | 1.2 | 2016 |
| Tanzania | 3.9 | 2016 |
| Uganda | 5.5 | 2016 |

== See also ==
- Arranged marriage
- Human trafficking
- Baad (practice)
- Because I Am a Girl
- Child sexuality
- Forced marriage
- Jewish views on marriage
- List of child brides
- List of child bridegrooms
- Marriageable age
- Supplementary Convention on the Abolition of Slavery
- Teenage marriage
- Teenage pregnancy
- Westermarck effect
