= Polygamy in Afghanistan =

The Islamic Emirate of Afghanistan, which is governed by Afghan law, allows for polygyny. Afghan men historically could take up to four wives, as Islam has allowed for such. A man must treat all of his wives equally; however, it has been reported that these regulations are rarely followed. While the Qur'an states that a man is allowed a maximum of four wives, there is an unspecified number of women allowed to be his 'concubines'. These women are considered unprotected and need a man as a guardian.

== Cultural reasons ==
A common reason for a man to take another wife would be a woman's infertility. Due to the stigma placed on divorce in Afghan society, polygamous relationships are adopted to cope with differences between a husband and wife. Other reports have made it apparent that most Afghan women would rather be a man's third or fourth wife than remain single, even if she is abused or unfairly treated by her husband. It is more common for wealthy men to marry several wives. Practicing polygamous marriages allows men to acquire more land shares, property, wealth, and children. Polygamy is seen to be economically profitable and can increase societal influence for men. In northern Afghanistan, women who are skilled in weaving carpets and rugs are considered a resource to contributing to the family's income. It is common for older men to marry younger girls in polygamous marriages in Afghanistan. In the case of death, widowed women are forced to remarry. Men are obligated to marry the widow of a male family member. A widow who refuses to remarry an in-law faces the possibility of losing custody of their children.

== Gender roles ==
=== Men ===
Though permitted, polygamy is not universally approved by all Afghan men. Some men that can afford to support several wives prefer monogamist relationships because there is a worry about domestic trouble in Afghan harems. Disputes among women married to the same man is described to be the most prevalent reason for the disapproval of polygamy.

Large number of Afghan men cannot afford big dowries and wedding costs. A majority of the pastoral population only take one wife. When the nonprofit International Council on Security and Development interviewed more than 420 Afghan men in 2010, 82 percent suggested that the best way to discourage young men from joining the Taliban would be to provide them with money for dowries and weddings. In general, there are not enough women for some men to have multiple wives and, at the same time, for every man to have one wife.

=== Women ===
Consent is not required when it comes to women marrying married men. Some factors that force women to show consent are the lack of centralization in the family, economic problems, and death of a previous husband. Women living alone is against the social norms in Afghanistan, making them dependent on their parents and relatives. Unmarried women can be seen as a burden, so they are forced to get married. Many women give consent to marriage without knowledge of the man's marital status. The civil law of Afghanistan states that men are obligated to inform all his wives and prospective brides about each other. This condition in the civil law is not practiced in many cases. Many men have failed to tell their second wives about his marital status. The civil law of Afghanistan also states that the first wife has the ability to approve her husband's second marriage. The law allows a wife the right to separate from her husband if he fails to get her consent. Many women choose not to practice this right because she risks losing custody of her children, financial support, and family status.

== Polygamy and politics ==
In the eighteenth and nineteenth-century, polygamous unions for politics was a common practice. The Durrani Pashtun leaders took on more than four wives to obtain more privileged positions. The large number of royal offspring caused confusion on the hierarchical order which resulted in feuds between the family. Historians credit the polygamic-based inter-dynastic rivalries for causing political instability, social and economic development and national unity.

== Contemporary attitudes ==
Before 1928, many men abused the concept of 'concubinage' which allowed them to take on more than four wives. King Amanullah (1919–1928) created strict laws that limited polygamy to only four lawful wives. Amanullah believed that monogamy was more Islamic and promoted women's rights. Along with putting restrictions on polygamy, Amanullah also encouraged women to unveil in public.

Polygamy in Afghanistan has never been outlawed. The restrictions have been regulated by the 1977 Civil Code which now require husbands seeking new wives to prove that there no fear of injustice to his current wives, have the means to provide his wives with basic necessities, and a lawful reason must exist for the new marriage. The 1977 Civil Code gave women the right to divorce her husband if he violates any of the conditions required to take on a new wife.

In June 2000, the women's conference in Kabul attempted to make an appeal that forced marriage should be considered a criminal offense and that women who are forced into marriages should be granted the status of being a victim.

In 2009, President Hamid Karzai issued a decree known as the Elimination of Violence Against Women Act. The decree, which would have outlawed polygamy, was never ratified by the legislature.

In May 2022, Supreme Leader Hibatullah Akhundzada issued a decree banning Taliban members from taking multiple wives.

== See also ==
- Child marriage in Afghanistan
