= Child marriage in Burkina Faso =

In 2017 in Burkina Faso, 52% of girls were married before the age of 18 years. 10% were married before they turned 15. Burkina Faso has the fifth-highest national rate in the world for child marriage.
