= Child marriage in Somalia =

Child marriage in Somalia is a marriage in which the bride is less than 18 years of age. Most child marriages involve girls aged 15-18 years old, many of whom are from poor families.

== Tradition ==
Traditionally, dating is not an aspect of Somali culture, this is especially because marriage occurs quite early in the teenage years of Somalis. It is very shameful for a woman to become pregnant without being married and it becomes difficult for her to find a husband. Marriage is encouraged for anyone who has reached the age of maturity, which is considered to be from age 15 and older. A 1890 British description stated that most Somalis marry at 15 or 16 years old.

== Legal history ==
The first modern state regulation of marriage age came under the government of Siad Barre. The 1975 Family Code introduced secular family law and attempted to standardize marriage rules establishing the legal age for marriage at 18 years for both men and women but allowing girls to marry at 16 years with consent of a parent/guardian. The Family Code of 1975 also states that a marriage contracted under compulsion is invalid and that failure to register a marriage would be punishable by fine. By 1985, the average age at first marriage ranged from 18.6 years in the rural agricultural sector to 20.4 years among the nomadic population.

Somalia's Provisional Constitution (2012) states that a marriage shall not be legal without the free consent of both the man and the woman or if either party has not reached the age of maturity. However, it does not define the age of maturity. In October 2025, Somalia ratified the African Charter on the Rights and Welfare of the Child. However, following parliamentary ratification, the Ministry of Family and Human Rights Development issued a statement reaffirming the country's commitment to child rights but emphasizing that Somalia's national constitution and Islamic teachings remain the supreme legal authorities guiding interpretation and implementation. The Somaliland constitution also does not explicitly define a legal marriage age.

== Statistics ==
According to the Somali government's Health and Demographic Survey in 2020, 16% of women aged 20-24 interviewed were married by the time they turned 15, and 34% were married between 15 and 18 years old. According to the survey, the median age at first marriage was 20 for women aged 25-49 and 23 for men aged 25-64.

== Cases of child marriage in Somalia ==
In March 2025, public outrage erupted after an eight-year-old girl, missing for six months, was found living with a man in Carmo who claimed to be her husband. The girl had been taken from her home in Bosaso in September 2024, allegedly with her father's consent for marriage to a man named Mahmoud. The case, which prompted widespread protests and condemnation from rights groups, reignited debate around child protection laws in the country. Puntland authorities intervened and returned the child to her family on 25 March 2025.
