= Child marriage in Cameroon =

Child marriage in Cameroon is common and influenced by factors such as poverty, rural and social norms, and lack of enforcement of preventive laws.

== Statistics ==
Child marriage in Cameroon is common. In 2017, 31% of girls are married off before their 18th birthday, and the national median age for first marriages is 18.5. Cameroon holds the 8th highest marriage rate before age 15 among African countries, with 10.7% of Cameroonian women married before age 15 as of 2020. Compared to the national median age of marriage of 18.5, the median age of marriage for girls without education is 16. In Northern regions of Cameroon, Adamaoua, Far-North, and North, the median age is 16.5. 8% of adolescent girls give birth before the age of 16. Child marriage is most significant in the Far North Region, with 80% of women being married prematurely. There are estimated to be around a hundred million child brides in Africa.

== Causes ==
Factors leading to child marriage in Cameroon include education, poverty, rural, and social norms. Homogeneity in social norms regarding child marriage exists in rural Cameroon communities. Cameroonian families from rural villages tend to believe a child who refuses or delays a husband is considered to be bewitched or cursed by relatives. Several northern Moghamo villages believe that inexperienced and naive girls are more submissive and respectful wives. In these northern regions, several parents barter their unborn girls to lenders, with the wives being called "money women". In Magba, the Western region of Cameroon, maturity is determined through physical appearance, menstruation, and breast development rather than age. The practice of fattening, or Leblouh, where premature girls are fed copious food for several weeks to appear more mature, is common in the area. Child marriage is heavily practiced among the Assumbo, Oliti, and Bacheve clans found in the southwest region of Cameroon, with families traditionally having substantial control over marriages. Unions are often conceived as mutual contracts of families, with no involvement of romantic love.

== Laws regarding child marriage ==
Cameroon has inconsistent laws about their minimum age for marriage. The Cameroonian government has yet to adhere to the Maputo Protocol, where Article 6(b) constitutes the legal minimum age for marriage as 18 for boys and girls; official Cameroonian law holds 15 as the minimum age for marriage. However, Cameroon consented to the UN convention of the Rights of the Child, which sets the minimum age for marriage as 18. The Cameroonian penal code delineates that the punishment for forced child marriage in Cameroon is imprisonment for up to 10 years and fines, with this code rarely being enforced.

== Prevention programs in Cameroon ==
Several organizations are working to mitigate child marriage in Cameroon. Cameroon's Ministry of Women's Empowerment is constructing legislation to eliminate child marriage and genital mutilation in the region. Additionally, the Presbyterian Church of Cameroon has proposed resolutions and obligations for their followers to reject and challenge child marriage. The Church hosts programs training deaconesses to criticize the practice in Protestant girls' schools. Removing primary school tuition fees in Cameroon causes a 3% decline in child marriage in Cameroon., with several organizations such as UN Women offering literacy training, counseling, and economic support for young girls subject to child marriage.
