= Child marriage in Afghanistan =

According to UNICEF, child marriage is the "formal marriage or informal union before age 18", and it affects more girls than boys. Girls are increasingly at risk of child marriage in Afghanistan. In 2021, an estimated 28% of Afghan women were married before they turned 18. The most common ages for Afghan girls to get married have been 15 and 16. Factors such as gender dynamics, family structure, cultural, political and economic perceptions/ideologies all play a role in determining if a girl is married at a young age.

The practice of child marriage has been linked to detrimental consequences for girls, such as the inability to obtain an education and skills to work independently. Girls may also suffer physical harm, as their bodies are often not developed for childbirth, resulting in emotional, mental, and physical trauma for both the girl and her child.

== Laws regarding child marriage ==
=== Law of Afghanistan ===
According to Afghan Civil Law Article 40, "marriage is a contract between a male and female for the establishment of a family." Article 70 sets the legal age of marriage to be 16 for females and 18 for males; Article 71 (subsection 1) gives a girl's marriage rights to her father or guardian before the legal age of 16, and marriages for minors under the age of 15 are not allowed under any circumstances. Despite the establishment of Civil Law, regional customs take precedence over national law, as well as Sharia law. Due to shortcomings in the implementation of the Civil law, child marriages are still prevalent.

While new laws are being introduced progressively, the U.N. Development Programme's annual Gender Inequality Index still ranks Afghanistan as the sixth worst country for female equality in the world. 2009 statistics from the Afghan Independent Human Rights Commission showed that about 60–80% of the total marriages in Afghanistan were forced and/or underage marriage.

In 2009, Afghanistan passed the Law on the Elimination of Violence Against Women (EVAW), which guarantees penalties for domestic violence, abuses against women, as well as forced child marriage, yet the implementation of this law has not been thoroughly enforced, as there is also opposition for the law. In 2013, the Afghan parliament passed a law preventing girls from testifying against forced marriages, and the EVAW was protested by students at Kabul University, who deemed it "un-Islamic".

In May 2026, Decree No. 18 was issued by Afghanistan’s justice ministry, containing a part stating that the silence of a girl reaching puberty can be interpreted as consenting to get married, and containing a section on the marital separation of girls who reach puberty and are married, suggesting that child marriage for girls is legal in Afghanistan. The decree also stated that a marriage could be ruled invalid “if a father or grandfather has given a minor girl or boy without any dowry, not enough dowry or obscene embezzlement”, and that a girl married off by her father or grandfather to a man who “has not treated her with kindness or is well-known for his bad choices...has the right to approach the court to cancel the marriage contract upon reaching puberty.” It also states that if a girl’s husband refuses to divorce her “then in this case, there are no witnesses with the girl, the husband’s word is valid”, but that the girl does not need witnesses if she makes the request for a divorce before a judge.

=== Sharia law ===
In Islam, marriage represents a couple's acknowledgement of their social responsibility and an agreement to abide by the marriage contract's terms and conditions. One of the conditions in the Islam marriage contract requires the verbal and written consent of both the bride and groom, as well as the female's acceptance of the male's proposal.

Sharia law, also known as Islamic law, dictates the following regulations concerning marriage:

- There should be adulthood and sanity of both parties intending to get married.
- In case of non-adulthood, guardianship of father or grandfather is required for marriage.
- Father and grandfather are proprietors of their children and can marry them off."

Islam, particularly the Sunni school of Hanafi, is central to Afghan culture. From the mid-18th to mid-19th century, Afghan society was mostly decentralized, leaving different ethnic groups to decide how they should practice and implement Hanafi principles. However, research has shown that family judges often made rulings that ignored the rights of women outlined in Sharia.

Later, from 1880 to 1901, Amir Abdul Rahman Khan created royal decrees based on Sharia which sought to eliminate child and forced marriage. Similarly, as ruler from 1901-1919, his son Amir Habibullah Khan kept the same legislation in place in order to advance the rights of women.

From 1973 to 1978, President Mohammad Daoud Khan passed legislation related to family law, which was based on the more liberal Maliki law, and Decree Number 7 outlawed child marriage for girls under 16 and boys under 18 years of age. Punishment for violators was also implemented, which included imprisonment for up to three years.

== Reasons for child marriage ==
=== Compensation ===
Badal marriage occasionally occurs in rural parts where two families agree to exchange female members of their families, often to offset the cost of a marriage or to strengthen familial ties. It is arranged by parents or legal guardians to repay large debts or in some cases to compensate a victim's family if a crime has been committed. A single female is married into the victim's family, which is supposed to resolve the conflict. Badal marriages are ancient pre-Islamic practices and prohibited in Afghanistan.

The 2008 report "Early marriage in Afghanistan" said that regional differences accounted for a vast difference in child marriage incidence. Of the girls interviewed, 59% came from rural areas while 41% were from urban cities. Of those married at age 12, 75% resided in rural areas, as well.

=== Socioeconomic ===
Poverty is a common factor for child marriage; parents marry off their daughters because they have no financial resources to support them. The parents may receive a dowry from the groom at the time of the marriage. The cycle of poverty perpetuates itself, as child brides have limited future employment opportunities; in one survey, 94.3% of women who had been child brides reported that they were unemployed.

It is claimed that the 2021 Taliban's takeover of Afghanistan has increased poverty and child marriages. It was reported in 2025 that a six year old girl was forced to marry a man in southern Afghanistan after her father sold her for money and the Taliban advised him to wait till she turns nine to consummate the marriage.

== Effects ==
=== Health ===
Early child marriage places both the girl's health, as well as her child's health in jeopardy. Malnutrition, abuse, and HIV infection are a few of the detrimental health complications associated with early marriage. It has been reported that the risk of dying from childbirth and pregnancy is two times higher for girls between the ages of 15 and 19 than for older women. This, compounded with the fact that child marriages tend to occur in societies with poorer healthcare, results in higher rates of pregnancy complications and maternal mortality.

In Afghanistan, 34.1% of mothers who married early had children that were physically weak and 8.9% have reported that their children were born with a disability, in contrast to children in the United States, where 15 percent of children have a disability. Approximately 40.4% of early wed mothers report having a gynecological disease, and 20.2% suffer from a psychological disease. UNFPA reported 531 pregnancy-related death per 100,000 births for the age group of 15 to 19 years with most children suffering from obstetric fistula. The number reduces to 257 for 20 to 24 years of women.

Afghanistan continues to be among the top 10 countries with the highest maternal and infant mortality rates, and 32% of all deaths for girls ages 15–19 are pregnancy-related while 47% of deaths for women who were in the age range of 20-24 were also due to pregnancy complications. Fistula is one of the detrimental health effects caused by child marriage, and the 2011 survey conducted by the Social Health Development Program found that of the 3,040 women interviewed, 67% were between the ages of 16 and 20 when they were diagnosed with an obstetric fistula. Young mothers also suffer from pregnancy-induced hypertension as well as a higher risk of HIV infection.

=== Education ===
In 2004, the literacy rate for Afghan adolescent girls was about 21%. Once married, a child's education often comes to an end. Usually, this happens because the child undertakes domestic responsibilities, as well as childcare. However, even if the child manages to get permission to attend school, the school administrators will often deny her a place in school, which is due to a belief that having married girls in a school is detrimental to the morals of unmarried girls. Depriving girls of an education inhibits their ability to obtain sustainable economic opportunities, which limits independence and further subjects them to poverty. A lack of education also forces girls to continue living in abusive situations, as they are unaware of other options.

According to a 2008 report, literacy rate displayed a strong correlation with child marriage, as out of 200 interviewees, 71% of parents who forced their daughters to marry, as well as 70% of the girls, and 50% of the husbands were illiterate.

=== Domestic violence ===
Domestic violence in Afghanistan is often exacerbated due to a variety of factors, such as poverty, illiteracy, and narcotics. Global Rights reported in a 2006 survey that "more than 85% of Afghan women reported that they had experienced physical, sexual, or psychological violence or forced marriage." Adverse health and economic impacts are linked to domestic violence, and studies indicate that approximately 2,000 girls have attempted suicide due to the unbearable conditions they were subject to. Even if girls attempt to escape from an abusive relationship, they are accused of running away, which can lead to arrest. Because they marry at a young age, girls who are child brides also have less power, which places them in a position where they may lack authority in every-day decisions, and research has shown that in time, they may even justify domestic violence.

== International recommendations ==
=== United Nations Population Fund ===
In their chapter "Giving Girls A Chance: An Agenda for Action", the United Nations Population Fund outlined the following strategies for improving the conditions of girls who are most vulnerable to early marriage:

- Create programs that develop skills and enhance social networks: When girls are allowed to interact with others and have the ability to share their interests by networking, families may find value in their abilities, which may improve their chances of a delayed marriage. Girls will also have more awareness of their rights under the law, and their knowledge concerning overall well-being will also be improved.
- Make formal education/economic opportunities more accessible: Because girls who are illiterate have higher chances of becoming child brides, permitting them to have an education allows them to have access to more opportunities, and the families, as well as communities, will see that this is an alternative option for early marriage. Government incentives, such as subsidies, are possible ways that can encourage families to allow girls to remain in school, as well as free supplies and a safe environment. By providing parents with loans and scholarships for school, a financial burden is lifted, and if employment opportunities are also provided, they give parents more options in regards to a girl's future.
- Change harmful social/cultural norms: By changing the perception of community leaders, as well as parents, in regards to a girl's value and development, child marriage can be discouraged and eventually regarded as detrimental. Community communication, education for parents, and media can all encourage a shift in attitude in order to make such a practice unacceptable.
- Proper implementation of legislation: The creation of laws prohibiting child marriage must be accompanied by proper implementation, particularly a strict adherence to inhibiting any marriages to occur below the age of 18. Birth registration also makes the federal government accountable for upholding such laws, as without proper registration, girls may be subject to marriage even though are not the legal age.

=== International human rights declarations ===
Various international conventions have outlined regulations that prohibit child marriage. The following are organizations that have taken a stance against the practice of child marriage:

- In 1948, Article 16 of the Universal Declaration of Human Rights, as well as the 1966 International Covenant on Economic, Social and Cultural Rights and the 1966 International Covenant on Civil and Political Rights made provisions stating that marriage should only be entered with consent of both parties and that equal rights are to be observed in such a union.
- The 1956 Supplementary Convention on the Abolition of Slavery, the Slave Trade, and Institutions and Practices Similar to Slavery deemed any practice that prohibited women from having a voice or consent, as well as economic gain for the family to be a form of slavery.
- Similarly, the 1964 Convention on Consent to Marriage, Minimum Age for Marriage and Registration of Marriages and the 1979 Convention on the Elimination of All Forms of Discrimination against Women declared that both parties should be willing to enter into the marriage and that child marriage was unacceptable under any circumstance.

== Related literature ==
- In her book I am Malala, Malala Yousafzai mentions the practice of child marriage in Pakistan, particularly in her native Swat District of Khyber Pakhtunkhwa.
- Memories of a Child Marriage by SETHULAKSHMI gives insight into a young girl's child marriage in India with emphasis on the ceremony, as well as her personal sentiments.
- I Am Nujood, Age 10 and Divorced by Nujood Ali, Delphine Minou, and Linda Coverdale (translator)
- Opium Nation: Child Brides, Drug Lords, and One Woman's Journey Through Afghanistan by Fariba Nawa

== See also ==
- Polygamy in Afghanistan
- International Day for the Elimination of Child, Early and Forced Marriage
