= Child marriage in Ethiopia =

Child marriage in Ethiopia is a marriage in which the bride is less than 18 years of age. Ethiopia is one of the countries with the highest rate of child marriage in the world. A study examining early marriage across several Ethiopian districts reported that 69.9% of surveyed women had married before age 18, with a mean age at first marriage of about 14.8 years.

== Legal history ==
Under the 1960 Ethiopian Civil Code, the minimum legal age of marriage was historically 15 for girls and 18 for boys. Marriages below these ages were considered invalid under the code. A major reform occurred with the 2002 Revised Family Code of Ethiopia, which raised the minimum age of marriage to 18 for both men and women and required the free and full consent of both spouses. The prohibition was strengthened with the 2004 Criminal Code of the Federal Democratic Republic of Ethiopia, which criminalized child marriage. Article 648 established prison penalties of up to three years for marriage involving minors aged 13–17 and up to seven years if the minor is under 13. In addition to these laws, the Ethiopian government adopted national policies to eliminate harmful traditional practices, including the 2013 National Strategy and Action Plan on Harmful Traditional Practices Against Women and Children, aimed at ending child marriage nationwide.

Despite these legal reforms, child marriage remains widespread in parts of Ethiopia, particularly in rural areas, where demographic surveys and academic studies continue to report high rates of marriage before the age of 18. Regional governments in Amhara and Tigray run programs to educate young women on issues associated with early marriage. There have been some signs of growing public awareness in communities of the problem of abuse of women and girls, including early marriage.

== Amhara ==
The Amhara region median age at first marriage is 15.1 years for women aged 20-49, it is the country's lowest median age at first marriage. Amhara also has the second highest rate of child marriage in Ethiopia. In 2009, the Amhara rate of early adolescent marriage was approaching twice that of the next highest region (Benishangul-Gumuz with 23.9%). The same survey also found that Amhara had the country's highest rates of arranged marriage (more than 94%) and the second highest rate of early adolescent sexual debut (20% had sex before the age of 15, almost exclusively within the confines of marriage).

In 2011, a survey in North Gondar zone showed that 44.2% of girls were married before the age of 15. In 2013, 52% of girls were married before the age of 15 and 25% give birth before age 18. A survey by the Population Council found that 85% of girls in Amhara did not have any warning they were going to be married, 95% did not know their husbands before marriage, 81% said their first sexual experience was physically forced, and over 66% had not reached puberty by that encounter. More than half of the child brides in Amhara are married to a man at least 10 years older.

A 2023 study found that child marriage in the Amhara region remained widespread in at around 42%. A systematic review and meta-analysis of 14 studies (67,040 participants) estimated the national prevalence of early marriage in Ethiopia at 56.3%, with the highest prevalence in the Amhara region at about 59.0%.

== Tigray ==
A demographic analysis of the Ethiopian Demographic and Health Survey found that 68.8% of women aged 20–24 in the Tigray region had married before the age of 18 in 2005, declining to 43.0% in 2011 and 42.8% in 2016. The same dataset shows that marriage before age 15 in Tigray declined from 26.1% in 2005 to 15.8% in 2016. Comparing her granddaughter's life with her own at the same age, one woman in Tigray emphasised how much more empowered young women are today. She contrasted women's past suffering with circumstances of the current generation :

"My granddaughter is 14 years old now and if I tell her that she is going to marry, she will reply "marry yourself!" During our time, we were unable to decide on our life but today children have the right to decide.. Children today are very much wise.. Her life will definitely be good because she will be educated and may even marry someone who is educated."

Another Tigrayan woman who was married at 14 and had her first baby at 17 said :

"I was too young at the time to tolerate all the troubles. I often fell down, and once missed the direction of my home. I was too busy and I could not withstand all challenges and responsibilities. All this embarrassed me and forced me to divorce.. At that time most females were too young for marriage and it was too difficult to withstand the challenges of life like falling from mountains or fetching water. That is why most prefer to divorce."

== Oromia ==
According to the 2016 Ethiopian Demographic and Health Survey, about 48% of women aged 20–24 in the Oromia region were married before the age of 18. Analysis of Demographic and Health Survey data also found that marriage before age 15 in Oromia was approximately 12% in 2016, reflecting a lower prevalence of very early marriage compared to regions such as Tigray and Amhara. Research examining regional trends in Ethiopia has noted that Oromia remains among the regions where roughly half of girls marry before age 18. One of the women interviewed in Oromia complained about being made to marry in her early teens to a drunkard who squandered most of the bridewealth.

== Other regions ==
Among women aged 20–24 years in the Afar region, about 67 % were married before age 18, the median age at first marriage for Afar women was 16.4 years, in the Somali region the median age was 18 years old. Both regions have not updated their regional family codes to fully outlaw child marriage. In a 2007 census, around 16 % of girls aged 15–17 had ever been married in Shinile in the Somali region. Benishangul‑Gumuz has one of the highest child marriage rates at around 50% and Addis Ababa has the lowest child marriage rate at around 8%.

== Causes ==
Ethiopia is just another example of a developing country in which extreme poverty leads to child marriages. Originally, child marriage was a custom that occurred between two wealthy families. Rich people were attracted to early marriage as a way to establish an alliance with two strong households in order to ensure land and cattle for their offspring. Nonetheless, this trend gradually decreased with the loss of resources in rural Ethiopia and the increase of poverty. The financial struggle that families often find themselves with is not in their control. Several families are forced into poverty because of the loss of a parent. It has been discovered that one in five out of the total of 3,000 Ethiopian children have been orphaned of at least one parent. There is also the possibility that the child is from a drought-stricken rural area, these communities tend to have higher poverty rates which directly increase the child marriage rates. Child marriage is actually considered the preferred preventive method compared to more drastic practices such as female genital mutilation. This fear is only validated by the continued practice of a tradition that allows men to abduct girls and force them to become their bride. This act commonly known as bride napping is seen in several developing countries but is especially prevalent in the countryside of Ethiopia. Often when men are too poor to afford a dowry they simply kidnap the bride of their choice and force her into marriage. Men usually gather their friends and ride on horseback to go and collect their future wives while they walk home from grade school. Once they have successfully obtained the girl the husband to be takes the liberty of raping his young wife and claiming her as his own. This is seen as a form of courtship because once a girl has lost her virginity in Ethiopian culture she is seen as impure and tainted for other men. This abduction process is overseen by the local council of elders who have final say in most matters and tend to agree with abduction practices, basing their decisions on tradition and culture. Ethiopian culture contains several groups of thought that promote the occurrence of child marriage such as the idea that "a girl who is not married by late adolescence represents a failure and disgrace to the family. In particular, the status of the girl's father is compromised, and he is considered a failure when his daughter remains unmarried into her late teens".
