= Child marriage in Ivory Coast =

Child marriage in the Ivory Coast is under 18

Child marriage is the betrothal of girls and boys below the age of 18.

In the Ivory Coast, child marriage is a prevalent issue within the country and affects millions of residents on a day-to-day basis. Recent efforts have been done to reduce its presence within the country, however, a lack of funds and unregistered births have significantly hindered its progress and progress has stagnated in recent years.

== Legal status ==
Under Marriage Act 1983, in the Ivory Coast it is illegal in for a marriage to occur for a man under the age of twenty and a woman under the age of eighteen, but a public prosecutor can grant an exception to this law with parental consent. And in Article 378 of the Ivorian Penal Code any person who forces a marriage upon a person under the age of eighteen will be imprisoned for 1 to 5 years and/or will be fined between 360,000 and 1,000,000 francs. Despite these laws, in 2021, 7.4% of girls were married before age 15, and 25.% were married before age 18.

In 2019, the Council of Ministers of Côte d'Ivoire has approved a bill to amend marriage law and make the age of consent eighteen for both sexes, prevent prosecutors from granting exceptions, and ensure stricter standards on verification of the ages of the parties to be married. Along with that, the bill allows women to manage their collective properties, although only one party in the marriage would be allowed to manage it. The bill also prohibits same-sex marriage, with it defining marriage as to be only between a woman and a man, and it still needs to be approved by the President and the Parliament before it goes into effect.

== See also ==
- Polygamy in Ivory Coast
