= Child marriage in Mali =

Child marriage in Mali is an ongoing practice. Mali has the 5th highest prevalence of female child marriages globally. A study conducted by the Mali Institut National de la Statistique in 2018 found that 15% of 15-19 year old girls were married by the age of 15, a reduction compared to the 18% of women aged 20–49 who had been married by that age. The same study also shows that while 53% of women aged 20–49 were married before the age of 18, the same was true for only 3% of men, with no recorded marriages of boys aged 15 or younger.

The practice of bride kidnapping is a historic tradition in Mali. The act – which involves a would-be groom abducting a girl or woman to make her his bride – is still present in some sections of southern Mali, with cases of school girls being kidnapped at least as recently as 2017.

Marriages of girls under the age of 15 persists in Mali despite the Persons and Family Code (2011) setting the minimum age to 16. Prevalence is highest in rural areas with low literacy and high rates of poverty, in particular the south-western part of the country which is Muslim dominated. The regions of the country with the highest rates of child marriage are Kayes, Sikasso and Mopti.

On 11 October 2015, First Lady of Mali Keïta Aminata Maiga launched a national campaign to end the practice of child marriage in Mali.
