= Child marriage in Angola =

Child Marriage in Angola. In 2017 in Angola, 30% of girls are married off before the 18 yo. 8% are married before they turn 15.
