= Child marriage in the United States =

Marriageable age accounting for exceptions 18 17 16 15 No statutory minimum marriage age

Child marriage, defined by the United Nations as a marriage in which at least one party is under 18 years of age occurs legally in the United States. The United States is the only UN member state that has not yet ratified the Convention on the Rights of the Child. Its Committee on the Rights of the Child "reaffirms that the minimum age limit should be 18 years for marriage". Within the United States, each state and territory as well as Washington, D.C. set the marriage age in its jurisdiction. As of September 2026, Mississippi and New Mexico are the only two states that have no statutory minimum age when all exemptions are taken into account.

As of September 2026, child marriage is legal in thirty-two states. Eighteen states have banned underage marriages, with no exception. The first to do so was Delaware in 2018. This was followed by New Jersey (2018), Pennsylvania (2020), Minnesota (2020), Rhode Island (2021), New York (2021), Massachusetts (2022), Vermont (2023), Connecticut (2023), Michigan (2023), Washington (2024), Virginia (2024), New Hampshire (2024), Maine (2025), Oregon (2025), Missouri (2025), Oklahoma (2026), and California (2026). American Samoa, the U.S. Virgin Islands, and Washington, D.C. have also ended child marriage in that time. Several other U.S. states have similar legislation pending.

Between 2000 and 2021, some 315,000 minors were legally married in the United States. The vast majority of child marriages (some 86%) were between a minor girl and an adult man. In many cases, minors in the U.S. may be married when they are under the age of sexual consent, which varies from 16 to 18 depending on the state. In some states, minors cannot legally divorce or leave their spouse, and domestic violence shelters typically do not accept minors.

Historically, child marriage has been a culturally acceptable practice, but it is increasingly viewed as a form of child sexual abuse. It is an internationally recognized health and human rights violation disproportionately affecting girls, globally. Some international agencies, including the U.S. State Department, have declared it a human rights violation. Some researchers have concluded that there are consequences to child marriages; along with the threat of sexual abuse, children may be subject to loss of educational progress, early pregnancies, and psychological trauma.

== Background ==
=== History ===
In ancient and medieval civilizations, it was a regular practice to give girls away in marriage as soon as they reached puberty, if not earlier. This practice continued throughout the Middle Ages, and most girls were married by age fifteen. In Antebellum America, marriages between older men and younger women were socially acceptable, while not extremely common. Marriage was viewed more as a contract, and the minors to be wedded, typically girls, were thought of as going from the responsibility of one man, the father, to another man, the husband.

=== Causes ===
There is no singular justification for child marriage. Some marry in accordance with religious or cultural traditions. Others do so to avoid legal ramifications of sexual activities with minors. Others may marry a child to obtain an immigration visa. Traditionally, specifically in developing nations, one of the most common reasons for child marriage was avoiding negative stigmas associated with premarital sex and teen pregnancy. By arranging the marriage of minors, typically girls and boys or men who have been involved in sex before marriage, the families seek to save face and maintain respect within the community.

=== Demographics ===
A 2018 study by researchers Alissa Koski and Jody Heymann detailing the prevalence of child marriage in the U.S. and common characteristics of those unions found that about 6 out of every 1,000 children surveyed were married. Prevalence varied by location, race/ethnicity, gender and age. Unchained At Last, an organization dedicated to ending forced and child marriage in the United States, found marriage certificates had been issued to an estimated 314,154 children between 2000 and 2021.

==== Gender ====
Young females are more likely to be married than young males. According to statistics released by the Pew Research Center (based upon the American Community Survey), 55% of the surveyed married 15–17 year olds were girls. According to a Frontline report, 87% of the total minors who got married in 2000-2015 were girls. Koski and Heymann found child marriage was higher among girls than among boys (6.8 vs. 5.7 per 1,000, or a ~19% difference). According to Unchained At Last's study, 86% of the children who married in the U.S. between 2000 and 2021 were girls – and most were wed to adult men an average of four years older.

==== Location ====
According to information compiled by the Pew Research Center, child marriage is generally more common in some of the Southern United States.

The highest rates of child marriages are in West Virginia, Florida, Texas, Nevada, Oklahoma, Arkansas, California, Tennessee, and North Carolina. According to a Frontline report, the states with the highest rates of child marriage in 2010 were: Idaho, Utah, Arizona, Texas, Mississippi, Alabama, Arkansas, Kentucky, West Virginia and Missouri. The states with the lowest rates were Delaware, New Jersey, Montana, Indiana, North Dakota, Ohio, New York, Vermont, New Hampshire and Massachusetts.

Unchained At Last found that the ten states with the highest rate of child marriage per capita between 2000 and 2021 were:

1. Nevada
2. Idaho
3. Utah
4. Kentucky
5. Wyoming
6. West Virginia
7. Alabama
8. Mississippi
9. Tennessee
10. Texas

The Koski/Heymann study found prevalence of child marriage varied from more than 10 per 1,000 in West Virginia, Hawaii and North Dakota to less than four per 1,000 in Maine, Rhode Island and Wyoming.

- In Texas from 2000 to 2014, almost 40,000 children were married.
- In Florida, 16,400 children, some as young as 13, were married from 2000 to 2017, which is the second highest incidence of child marriage after Texas.
- In Alabama there were over 8,600 child marriages from 2000 to 2015, the fourth highest amount of any state. However, child marriage in Alabama showed a large decline in that time. In 2000, almost 1,200 children married, but by 2014 it dropped to 190.
- In Virginia between 2004 and 2013, nearly 4,500 children were married according to the Tahirih Justice Center.
- In Ohio from 2000 to 2015 there were 4,443 girls married aged 17 and younger, including 43 aged 15 and under.
- In New York, more than 3,800 children were married between 2000 and 2010.

The Koski/Heymann study also found that only 20% of married children were living with their spouses; the majority of the rest were living with their parents.

==== Race/ethnicity ====
Cases of child marriage exist in every racial or ethnic demographic but are more prevalent in some as compared to others. Instances of marriage were lower among white non-Hispanic children (5.0 per 1,000) than among almost every other racial or ethnic group studied; it was especially high among children of Native American or Chinese descent (10.3 and 14.2, respectively). Girls of Hispanic/Latina origin are more likely than those of black or white heritage to be married as a minor.

It was more common for immigrating children to be married than those born within the United States. Between the budget years 2007 and 2017, U.S. Citizenship and Immigration Services received 3.5 million immigration petitions, resulting in 8,686 approvals for people in marriages or engagements where one or both members of the couple was still a minor at the time of the petition. The Koski/Heymann study found that prevalence among children from Mexico, Central America, and the Middle East was 2–4 times that of children born in the United States.

== Marriage age ==
The marriageable age is determined by each state and territory. In 1950, most US states set the marriage age without parental consent at 18 for women (14 in South Carolina, 20 in Hawaii, and 21 in Connecticut, Florida, Kentucky, Louisiana, Nebraska, Pennsylvania, Rhode Island, Virginia and West Virginia), and 21 for men (18 in Idaho, Michigan, North Carolina, South Carolina, Tennessee, and 20 in Hawaii and New Hampshire), but in most of the states there were exemptions allowing marriage below the general age of marriage with parental consent. In 1950, the age of marriage with parental consent for women varied between 12 and 18, with 16 being the most common age, while the age of marriage with parental consent for men varied between 12 and 20, with 18 being the most common age. With the setting of the age of majority at 18 in most states in the 1970s, the general marriage age without parental consent for both men and women was set at 18 in most states, but exemptions allowing marriage under this age with parental and/or judicial consent continued to exist.

=== Extent ===
Unchained At Last, a non-profit advocacy group dedicated to ending child marriage in the United States, found that only 14% of the child marriages conducted from 2000 to 2010 were between two children. In the other 86% of cases, child marriages are between a minor and an adult. The majority of spouses in the survey, about 60%, reported being 18–20 years old. Less than 3% reported being over 29 years of age. In over 400 cases, the adult was aged over 40, and in 31 cases, they were over 60.

According to data compiled by Anjali Tsui, Dan Nolan, and Chris Amico, who looked at almost 200,000 cases of child marriage from 2000 to 2015:

- 67% of the children were aged 17.
- 29% of the children were aged 16.
- 4% of the children were aged 15.
- Less than 1% of the children were aged 14 and under.
- There were 51 cases of 13-year-olds getting married, and 6 cases of 12-year-olds getting married.

=== U.S. states ===
As of September 2026, child marriage is legal in 32 states. Eighteen states have banned underage marriages without exception. The first one was Delaware in 2018. Then came New York, Rhode Island, Pennsylvania, Minnesota, New Jersey, Massachusetts, Vermont, Connecticut, Michigan, Washington, Virginia, New Hampshire, Oregon, Maine Missouri, Oklahoma, and California. The remaining 32 states allow underage marriage if one or more of the following circumstances apply:

- consent of a court clerk or judge (sometimes the consent of a superior court judge, rather than a local judge, is required)
- consent of the parents or legal guardians of the minor
- if one of the parties is pregnant, or if the minor has given birth to a child
- if the minor is emancipated.

As of September 2026, the lower minimum marriage age when all exceptions are taken into account, are:

- 2 states have no minimum age (possibly 0, but minimum ages of 12 for girls and 14 for boys under common law may apply).
- 2 states have a minimum age of 15.
- 20 states have a minimum age of 16.
- 8 states have a minimum age of 17.
- 18 states have a minimum age of 18.

From 2017 to 2026, several states changed their law to set a minimum age, to raise their minimum age, or to make more stringent the conditions under which an underage marriage may occur.

=== U.S. territories ===
In the District of Columbia, minors can't marry as of 2025. The general age of marriage in Puerto Rico is 21; however, 18-year-olds can marry, with exceptions (the age of majority in Puerto Rico is 21). In Guam, the general age is 18, but 16-year-olds can get married with the consent of at least one parent or guardian. In American Samoa, the marriage age has been changed to 18 for both sexes. This reflects a change in policy by Governor Lolo Moliga, who signed into law a bill that changed the marriage age for girls from 14 to 18 in September 2018. In the U.S. Virgin Islands, the age of marriage is 18 for both sexes. Prior to 2019, the age of marriage was 14 for females and 16 for males. In the Northern Mariana Islands males must be 18 to marry, while females can marry at 16 with parental consent.

=== Comparison with other countries ===
Critics have pointed out that laws regarding child marriage in the United States compare unfavorably to laws regarding child marriage in other countries. For instance, in 2017, Human Rights Watch pointed out that Afghanistan had a tougher law on child marriage than parts of the United States: in Afghanistan the minimum age of marriage is 15, and that is only with permission from their father or a judge; otherwise it is 16. As of that date, 25 U.S. states had no minimum marriage age at all if one or more of the grounds for exception existed; this number has continually decreased since then.

== Legal status ==
=== Underage marriage and sexual consent ===
In the United States, the age of sexual consent varies by state, territory/district, or federal law, and typically ranges from 16 to 18 years.

State-legislated age of consent laws and marriage age laws are inconsistent in relation to one another. In some states, it is possible for a minor to legally marry even if they are below the age of consent in that state. Between 2000 and 2021, nearly 315,000 minors were legally married in the United States. At least 66,415 of those occurred at an age or spousal age difference that should have been considered a sex crime. In about 90% of those marriages, the marriage license became a "get out of jail free" card for a would-be rapist under state law that specifically allowed within marriage what would otherwise be considered statutory rape. In the other 10% of those marriages, the marriage was legal under state law, but sex within the marriage was a crime.

In some cases, judges who approve an underage marriage, for example because the minor is pregnant, may be approving a marriage between a rapist and their statutory victim.

=== Emancipation by marriage ===
In some states, marriage automatically emancipates a minor or increases his or her legal rights beyond allowing the minor to consent to certain medical treatments. Emancipated minors are theoretically considered adults, so that they may be able to file for a restraining order, get a divorce, and benefit from social services in certain states, though these laws are not universal. However, in practice such minors may still encounter difficulties, as many institutions do not deal with minors, or require parental consent.

In some states, a minor is not emancipated by marriage, and legal proceedings are required to obtain an emancipation decree. The absence of emancipation may result in legal complications, if, for example, the minor wants to separate from their partner or wants a divorce. They may have to wait years before emancipation in order to reach adult age. Those non-emancipated married minors may find themselves locked into a marriage, unable to leave or divorce an abusive spouse. 70–80% of underage marriages end in divorce, but many minors locked in a marriage must wait years until they are old enough to legally end the marriage.

== Consequences ==
Common consequences of child marriage include a greater risk for sexual misconduct/abuse, psychological trauma, risk of death or injury in childbirth, and a likelihood to drop out of school.

=== Forced marriage and sex trafficking ===
In some cases, child marriage may (either legally or informally) constitute a forced marriage, often in the context of sex trafficking. This enables sexual abuse to continue. According to American Child Bride by Nicholas Syrett, "There is a long history in the United States of marriage laws being used to circumvent legal repercussions of sexual activity with a minor". Due to the way many U.S. marriage policies are written, finding loopholes is a possibility that has been exploited before. Additionally, women who have suffered sexual abuse are more likely to be revictimized in the future.

=== Psychological health ===
There are many effects that child marriages generally, and child abuse specifically, can have on an individual. The most common is the propensity for encountering abuse later on in life. According to data collected in 2015 by Jon Elhai, women who experienced traumatic events as children often experience mental health issues such as depression, anxiety, and mood disorders, as well as low self-esteem. A correlation between childhood sexual abuse and substance abuse has also been found.

=== Physical health ===
Adverse physical effects often accompany child marriages. The most prevalent is pregnancy and childbearing complications. The body is not fully matured under the age of 18, so minors who become pregnant often face complications that are not as common in their older counterparts.

UNICEF reported in 2007 that globally, a girl aged 15 is five times more likely to die in childbirth than women in their 20s. Young mothers also have an increased risk of developing obstetric fistula.

=== Educational impact ===
The loss of educational opportunity and influence is of particular importance to those opposed to child marriages. According to academics such as Martha Nussbaum, education is a crucial component to protecting one's freedom or capabilities. This in turn limits their autonomy and job eligibility, making them dependent on their spouse or caretaker.

== Prevention ==
=== Federal law ===
The Tahirih Justice Center is a national, nonprofit organization that serves immigrant survivors of gender-based violence and advocates to end forced and child marriage on the state and federal level. In 2013, the Violence Against Women Reauthorization Act mandated that the US Secretary of State must "establish and implement a multi-year, multi-sectoral strategy to end child marriage". The 2022 reauthorization of the Violence Against Women Act defined forced marriage as a form of gender-based harm present in the United States for the very first time and repealed the marriage defense to statutory rape on the federal level.

In 2022, Tahirih published a report alleging that federal immigration laws facilitate child marriage. Currently, there is no minimum age set by statute for a foreign beneficiary spouse or fiancé(e) or for a USC or LPR petitioner. In fact, a 2019 United States Senate Committee on Homeland Security and Governmental Affairs (HSGAC) report revealed over 8,000 spouse and fiancé(e) petitions involving at least one minor were approved by USCIS. The number of U.S. citizen adults who petitioned for minor foreign spouses and fiancé(e)s is almost double that of U.S. citizen minor petitioners. Many of these adult U.S. citizens were in their 40s and 50s, and in one case a 68-year-old U.S. citizen successfully petitioned for a 16-year-old foreign spouse. In another, a 71-year-old U.S. citizen petitioned for a 17-year-old foreign spouse.

=== U.S. territories and states ===
As of September 2026, 48 states have set absolute minimum marriage ages by statute, which vary between 15 and 18 years of age. Two states, Mississippi and New Mexico have no minimum marriage age. Until 2018, some form of child marriage was legal in every state. The organisation Unchained at Last, founded by Fraidy Reiss, has set about changing state laws individually since 2015; Reiss wrote the first state-wide bill banning child marriage in Delaware, which passed in 2018, followed closely by New Jersey. Efforts of the organisation and others have since resulted in total bans of child marriage in 18 states as of September 2026; 32 states still allow some forms of child marriage.

==== American Samoa ====
In September 2018, American Samoa raised the marriage age for girls from 14 to 18, to be in line with that of boys.

==== Alabama ====
In 2003, Alabama raised the minimum marriage age (with exceptions) from 14 to 16.

==== Arizona ====
In April 2018, Arizona raised the minimum marriage age to 16. Such underage marriages must be approved by a superior court, must have either parental consent or an emancipated minor, and the age difference between the parties must not be more than 3 years.

==== Arkansas ====
In April 2019, Arkansas raised the minimum marriage age for girls from 16 to 17 with parental consent, to be in line with that of boys. Previously, there was no minimum age for a pregnant girl to marry.

==== California ====
In California in 2017, a bill that would have ended child marriage (by raising the minimum age to 18) ran into opposition from legislators, the American Civil Liberties Union and Planned Parenthood due to the language of the bill.

From January 1, 2019 until sometime in 2026, California legally required the parents and partners of minors wishing to marry to meet with court officials separately, to determine if there was any coercion. Additionally, minors had to wait 30 days to get married, unless they were 17 and had completed high school, or one of the partners was pregnant.

In 2026, the governor of California signed a measure into law banning anyone under 18 from marrying.

==== Connecticut ====
On June 23, 2023, acting Connecticut governor Susan Bysiewicz signed a bill into law that ended all child marriage in Connecticut, making it the ninth state to set the marriage age at 18, without exceptions.

==== Delaware ====
In May 2018, Delaware became the first state to completely ban child marriage. The marriage age in Delaware is now 18, with no exceptions.

==== Florida ====
In early 2018, Florida passed and signed a law to amend its marriage laws, after having received intense media attention for its lax child marriage laws and the high toleration of the practice. Since July 1, 2018, the minimum marriage age is 17, and marriage before the age of 18 requires both parental and judicial approval, while the age difference between the parties must not be more than 2 years. The new law was passed after sustained lobbying from Sherry Johnson, who had been forced into marriage at age eleven.

==== Georgia ====
In May 2019, Georgia raised the marriage age explicitly from 16 to 17. They must be emancipated minors, must have completed a premarital education course, and cannot marry anyone more than four years older than themselves. The new law went into effect on July 1, 2019.

==== Idaho ====
In February 2019, a bipartisan anti-child marriage bill was voted down 39–28 by the Idaho House of Representatives. The bill would have made it illegal for anyone under 16 to get married. For 16- and 17-year-olds, it would have required the consent of parents, a judge, and the minor themselves. Idaho now has one of the highest rates of child marriage in the United States.

Representatives Bryan Zollinger and Julianne Young voted against, citing their opinion that judges should not be involved in marriages and that parental consent was sufficient. Representative Christy Zito complained that the bill would make it harder for people to start families if they conceive a child underage, compared to abortion.

In 2020, similar legislation passed. The minimum age for marriage in Idaho is currently 16 with parental consent and no more than a three-year age difference between the marrying parties.

==== Indiana ====
In March 2020, Indiana raised the minimum age for marriage from 15 to 16 with judicial approval if the intended spouse is no more than four years older. The new law also eliminated Indiana's previous exception that allowed minors to marry if they were pregnant.

==== Kentucky ====
In March 2018, Kentucky amended its marriage laws. After several failed attempts at restricting child marriage, a redrafted bill was introduced, passed all stages of the Kentucky Legislature, and was signed by the Governor of Kentucky on March 29, 2018. The new law sets a minimum age of 17, with judicial approval. Additionally, a 17-year-old cannot marry a person more than 4 years older than themselves, they must have completed high school or obtained an equivalent degree such as a GED, and must prove that they are able to take care of themselves.

==== Louisiana ====
Louisiana lawmakers set a minimum marriage age of 16 in 2019 with parental consent, judicial approval and an age difference between the minor and the intended spouse of no more than three years. Previously, Louisiana had no minimum age for marriage as long as the minor had parental consent and judicial approval.

==== Maine ====
Maine raised its marriage age twice—once in 2020 to 16, then again in 2023 to 17, both with parental consent--before banning marriage under the age of 18 in May 2025. Prior to 2020, Maine had no minimum age for marriage.

==== Maryland ====
After several failed attempts, Maryland legislators managed in 2022 to raise the marriage age from 15 to 17 with judicial approval and either parental consent or a court petition, and eliminate the exception that allowed minors to marry if they were pregnant.

==== Massachusetts ====
In July 2022, Massachusetts Governor Baker signed into law a bill raising the minimum age of marriage in all cases to the age of 18, with no exceptions made for parental or judicial consent, making Massachusetts the seventh state to end child marriage. The ban was included in section 80 of the FY2023 budget bill.

==== Michigan ====
In July 2023, Michigan banned marriage under the age of 18.

==== Minnesota ====
In May 2020, Minnesota became the fourth state to ban child marriage.

==== Missouri ====
In July 2018 Missouri raised the minimum age for marriage from 15 to 16 with parental permission and a spouse no older than 21. In 2025, the minimum age was raised to 18.

==== Nevada ====
In 2019, Nevada set a minimum age of 17 for marriage with parental consent and judicial approval. Minors marrying in Nevada also must prove residency. Previously, minors age 16 or 17 could marry with parental consent, and those under 16 could marry with parental consent and judicial approval.

==== New Hampshire ====
In 2018, New Hampshire passed a law, signed by Governor Chris Sununu, that raised the minimum marriage age from 14 to 16 with judicial approval. It took effect January 1, 2019. In May 2024, the Legislature voted to raise the minimum age to 18. The marriage age is now 18, no exceptions.

==== New Jersey ====
In June 2018, the New Jersey child marriage ban bill was signed into law by the Governor of New Jersey, Phil Murphy, and went into effect immediately to implement a clear minimum age of 18, with no exceptions. This makes New Jersey the second state to completely ban child marriage, after Delaware.

In May 2017, a similar bill was vetoed by Governor Chris Christie due to "religious concerns".

==== New York ====
In July 2021, New York became the sixth state to ban child marriage.

In 2017, New York state raised the marriage age to 18, but allowed marriage at 17 in special circumstances with parental and court consent. Prior to this law, the state allowed marriage in certain cases from the age of 14.

==== North Carolina ====
A 2021 bill raised the minimum age for marriage from 14 to 16. Additionally, under this bill, the spouse of a 16-year-old could be no more than four years older.

==== Ohio ====
In 2019, Ohio raised the minimum marriage age to 18 for both parties, but allowed an exemption for 17-year-olds to marry if they have juvenile court consent, go through a 14-day waiting period, and the age difference between the parties is not more than four years.

==== Oklahoma ====
In 2026, 18 became the minimum age for marriage in Oklahoma, without any exceptions.

==== Pennsylvania ====
In May 2020, Pennsylvania became the third state to ban child marriage. The marriage age is 18.

==== Rhode Island ====
In June 2021, Rhode Island became the fifth state to ban child marriage. The marriage age is 18, no exceptions.

==== Tennessee ====
In Tennessee, before 2018, there was no minimum marriage age with judicial consent. In March 2018, a proposed bill to end child marriage in Tennessee was terminated. The bill was revived due to political pressure, passed, and signed into law in May 2018 by Governor Haslam, preventing anyone younger than 17 from marrying in Tennessee.

==== Texas ====
In 2017, Texas raised the marriage age to 18; however, they kept an exception allowing emancipated minors aged 16–17 to marry.

==== Utah ====
On March 25, 2019, the Governor of Utah, Gary Herbert, signed a law which raised the minimum marriage age from 15 to 16, with judicial approval. The law also makes it illegal for a 16- or 17-year-old to marry someone who is more than 7 years older than them. The law passed the Utah House of Representatives 55 to 6, with 14 abstentions. It was described as a bipartisan effort, with a majority of Republicans, and all Democrats, voting in favor.

==== Vermont ====
Vermont Governor Phil Scott signed a law in 2023 setting the marriage age in Vermont as 18, without exceptions. Vermont is the eighth state to end child marriage.

==== Virginia ====
In April 2024, Virginia Governor Glenn Youngkin signed a law banning marriage under the age of 18 in Virginia, without exceptions.

In 2016, Virginia changed the law to set 18 as a minimum age, and 16 in special circumstances with judicial approval. Prior to the passing of that bill, there was no minimum age in the state.

==== Washington ====
In March 2024, Washington banned marriage under the age of 18. Prior to the passing of that bill, there was no minimum age in the state.

==== West Virginia ====
West Virginia set a minimum marriage age of 16 in 2023, if the minor has parental consent and the intended spouse is no more than four years older. Previously, West Virginia had no minimum age.

==== Wyoming ====
In 2023, Wyoming set a minimum marriage age of 16 with parental consent and judicial approval. Previously, Wyoming had no minimum age.

=== Non-governmental action ===
- Released in 2016, the US Global Strategy to Empower Adolescent Girls lists reducing child, early and forced marriage as a vital goal.
- The United Nations' Sustainable Development Goal 5.3 includes ending child marriage globally by the year 2030.
- The Tahirih Justice Center, in collaboration with the National Forced Marriage Working Group, presented a Framework for Addressing Forced and Child Marriage in the U.S. National Action Plan to End Gender-Based Violence. The first of its kind Action Plan ultimately recognized forced and child marriage as forms of harm occurring within the United States.
- Unchained at Last, an advocacy and social services agency in the United States, is working to end child marriage in the US.

== See also ==
- Age of consent in the United States
- Age of majority – Age of adulthood defined in law
- Age of marriage in the United States
- Age of sexual consent
- Forced marriage – Being married without consenting
- Marriageable age – Age where marriage is allowed by law
- Minor (law) – Person below a certain age prescribed by law
- Parental consent – Law requiring the consent of a parent before their child engages in a certain activity
- Sex trafficking in the United States
- Sexual consent in law – Key aspect in determining verdict
- Slavery in the 21st century
- International Day for the Elimination of Child, Early and Forced Marriage
