= The Book of Gutsy Women =

Book by Hillary and Chelsea Clinton

The Book of Gutsy Women: Favorite Stories of Courage and Resilience
- Authors: Hillary Rodham Clinton, Chelsea Clinton
- Language: English
- Subject: Heroic women
- Genre: Non-fiction
- Publisher: Simon & Schuster
- Publication date: October 1, 2019
- Publication place: United States
- Media type: Print
- Pages: 464
- ISBN: 1-5011-7841-5
- Preceded by: What Happened
- Followed by: State of Terror
- Website: Publisher website

The Book of Gutsy Women: Favorite Stories of Courage and Resilience is a book co-authored by Hillary Rodham Clinton, the former U.S. first lady, senator, and secretary of state, and her daughter Chelsea Clinton. It is Hillary Clinton's eighth book with her publisher, Simon & Schuster.

It was released on October 1, 2019, and includes portraits of "gutsy women" including Chimamanda Ngozi Adichie, Mary Ritter Beard, Harriet Tubman, Edith Windsor, and Malala Yousafzai. In many cases the authors describe how the subjects influenced their lives and in some cases how they met them. In explaining their motivation to write the book, the authors say, "If history shows one thing, it's that the world needs gutsy women. So in the moments when the long haul seems awfully long, we hope you will draw strength from these stories. We do." Hillary Clinton added, "This book is a continuation of a conversation Chelsea and I have been having since she was a little girl, and we are excited to welcome others into that conversation."

The book received mixed-to-positive critical notices from those media outlets that reviewed it. It spent ten weeks on The New York Times Best Seller list.

== Background ==
The first book co-authored by the mother and daughter, it has sections labeled as "Hillary", "Chelsea", and "Hillary and Chelsea" to clarify who wrote what. The former wrote in longhand while the latter sought to use collaborative software, making the writing process somewhat frustrating. The book was also written with the assistance of Lauren Peterson, a former speechwriter from her 2016 presidential campaign. There are no footnotes or other indications in the book of where the research for the profiles comes from.

Financial terms of the book were not disclosed when the project was announced in August 2019.

== Contents ==
More than one hundred women are featured in the volume, selected from more than two hundred essays the pair wrote. Entries range from 17th-century nun and self-taught scholar Juana Inés de la Cruz to contemporary teenage climate activist Greta Thunberg, and include women who are little known to the general public. Some of the less familiar subjects include astronomer Caroline Herschel, doctor Mary Edwards Walker, pediatrician and professor Mona Hanna-Attisha, and women's rights advocate Manal al-Sharif. Some family members of the Clintons are also included as subjects.

The cover image shows, as the authors state, a group of women firefighters in a training exercise at Pearl Harbor Naval Shipyard sometime after U.S. entry into World War II. (The photograph has often been mislabeled as being made during the attack on Pearl Harbor. The story behind the black-and-white image was told by investigative reporter Bill Dedman in 2011. It has been colorized for the cover of this book.)

=== Complete list ===
These are the entries in the book, as listed in its Table of Contents:

==== Early Inspirations ====
- First Inspirations
- Harriet Tubman
- Anna Pavlova, Isadora Duncan, Maria Tallchief, and Virginia Johnson
- Helen Keller
- Margaret Chase Smith
- Margaret Bourke-White
- Maria von Trapp
- Anne Frank
- Rigoberta Menchú Tum
- Jackie Joyner-Kersee and Florence Griffith Joyner

==== Education Pioneers ====
- Sor Juana Inés de la Cruz
- Margaret Bancroft
- Juliette Gordon Low
- Maria Montessori and Joan Ganz Cooney
- Mary McLeod Bethune
- Esther Martinez
- Daisy Bates
- Patsy Mink, Bernice Sandler, and Edith Green
- Ruby Bridges Hall
- Malala Yousafzai

==== Earth Defenders ====
- Marjory Stoneman Douglas
- Rachel Carson
- Jane Jacobs and Peggy Shepard
- Jane Goodall and "The Trimates"
- Wangari Maathai
- Alice Min Soo Chun
- Greta Thunberg

==== Explorers and Inventors ====
- Caroline Herschel and Vera Rubin
- Ada Lovelace and Grace Hopper
- Margaret Knight and Madam C.J. Walker
- Marie Curie and Irène Joliot-Curie
- Hedy Lamarr
- Sylvia Earle
- Sally Ride
- Mae Jemison

==== Healers ====
- Florence Nightingale
- Clara Barton
- Elizabeth Blackwell, Rebecca Lee Crumpler, and Mary Edwards Walker
- Betty Ford
- Mathilde Krim
- Dr. Gao Yaojie
- Dr. Hawa Abdi
- Flossie Wong-Staal
- Molly Melching
- Dr. Mona Hanna-Attisha
- Vaccinators

==== Athletes ====
- Alice Coachman and Wilma Rudolph
- Junko Tabei
- Billie Jean King
- Diana Nyad
- Abby Wambach
- Michelle Kwan
- Venus and Serena Williams
- Ibtihaj Muhammad
- Tatyana McFadden
- Caster Semenya
- Aly Raisman

==== Advocates and Activists ====
- Dorothy Height and Sojourner Truth
- Ida B. Wells
- Eleanor Roosevelt
- Elizabeth Peratrovich
- Rosa Parks and Claudette Colvin
- Coretta Scott King
- Dolores Huerta
- The Peacemakers (Joyce McCartan, Monica McWilliams, Leymah Gbowee, and Tawakkol Karman)
- Victoria Mxenge
- Ai-jen Poo
- Sarah Brady, Gabby Giffords, Nelba Màrquez-Greene, Shannon Watts, and Lucy McBath
- Nza-Ari Khepra, Emma González, Naomi Wadler, Edna Chavez, Jazmine Wildcat, and Julia Spoor
- Becca Heller

==== Storytellers ====
- Maya Angelou
- Mary Beard
- Jineth Bedoya Lima
- Chimamanda Ngozi Adichie
- America Ferrera
- Ali Stroker
- Amani Al-Khatahtbeh

==== Elected Leaders ====
- Bella Abzug
- Shirley Chisholm
- Ann Richards
- Geraldine Ferraro
- Barbara Jordan
- Barbara Mikulski
- Ellen Johnson Sirleaf
- Wilma Mankiller
- Michelle Bachelet
- Danica Roem

==== Groundbreakers ====
- Frances Perkins
- Katharine Graham
- Constance Baker Motley
- Edie Windsor
- Ela Bhatt
- Temple Grandin
- Ellen DeGeneres
- Maya Lin
- Sally Yates
- Kimberly Bryant and Reshma Saujani

==== Women's Rights Champions ====
- Rosa May Billinghurst
- The Suffragists (Anna Julia Haywood Cooper, Mary Church Terrell, Alice Paul and Carrie Chapman Catt)
- Sophia Duleep Singh
- Fraidy Reiss
- Manal al-Sharif
- Nadia Murad

== Promotional activities ==
Upon the book's release, the authors appeared on several television talk shows to promote it. They also staged a book tour around the country, with some appearances being held under the title "An Evening and Conversation with Hillary Rodham Clinton and Chelsea Clinton". Sales were brisk in some locations, with tickets for an appearance at the Trinity United Methodist Church in Denver being gone within an hour.

Additional attention came to Hillary Clinton during interviews for the book, as publication of it happened to coincide with the filing on an Impeachment inquiry against Donald Trump. At a book tour appearance at the National Constitution Center in Philadelphia, which drew some 650 people, she said, "How appropriate that we would talk about a constitutional crisis such as the one we are in, right here at the Constitution Center." She asked whether anyone in the president's party was willing to act like the pioneering U.S. senator Margaret Chase Smith, who was one of the profiles in the book.

== Reception ==
The book received a positive notice from Viv Groskop, writing for the British newspaper i, who praised the "beautifully written stories of women's lives" and characterized it as "possibly a first: a cultural artefact inspired by a mother and a daughter which is neither cringeworthily sentimental nor frighteningly bitchy." Groskop concluded by saying, "The whole thing feels like a restrained statement of rebellion and also a sort of consolation." Feminist author Jo Freeman, writing for SeniorWomenWeb, said "This is a book that every young woman needs to read." Nancy Gilson in The Columbus Dispatch wrote that "a sense of female camaraderie permeates the book. ... It is a pleasure to read about favorite female heroines and an even greater pleasure to discover new ones."

Others were more critical, like The Daily Telegraph's Madeline Grant, who criticized the book for failing to include Margaret Thatcher – "the ultimate gutsy woman" in her words. Camilla Long of The Sunday Times wrote that the book "isn't a book of feminist icons – it's a list of people who think the same as Hillary." Keziah Featherstone, writing for TES, said that for educators the book was "a great introduction for those dedicated to a diverse and representative curriculum ... the range included is undoubtedly terrific." But she noted that the work "is framed as a long (long) conversation between mother and daughter" and said that was a detriment to readers who did not care that much about the Clintons.

The Book of Gutsy Women sold almost 30,000 print copies in its first week of availability, good for second place in the Publishers Weekly ranking of adult nonfiction. The book debuted at number two on The New York Times Best Seller list for combined print and e-book nonfiction for the week of October 20, 2019. In subsequent weeks it fell to number eight and then number thirteen, fell off the list, then reappeared for two more weeks at numbers fourteen and ten, fell off the list, then reappeared again at number fifteen. It fell off the list again, only to reappear during the holiday shopping season at number eight and then number six. This was followed by a drop to number thirteen and then, for its final appearance, number fifteen for the week of January 12, 2020. In all it had appeared on the list on ten non-consecutive weeks.
