= Solight Design =

Company that makes rechargeable solar lanterns

Solight Design is an American company that manufactures portable solar lanterns intended to provide lighting in disaster areas and to people who otherwise have no access to electricity. It was co-founded by architecture professor Alice Min Soo Chun. She designed the company's signature product, the SolarPuff lantern, which is based on an earlier product created by Chun and some of her students at the Columbia Graduate School of Architecture.

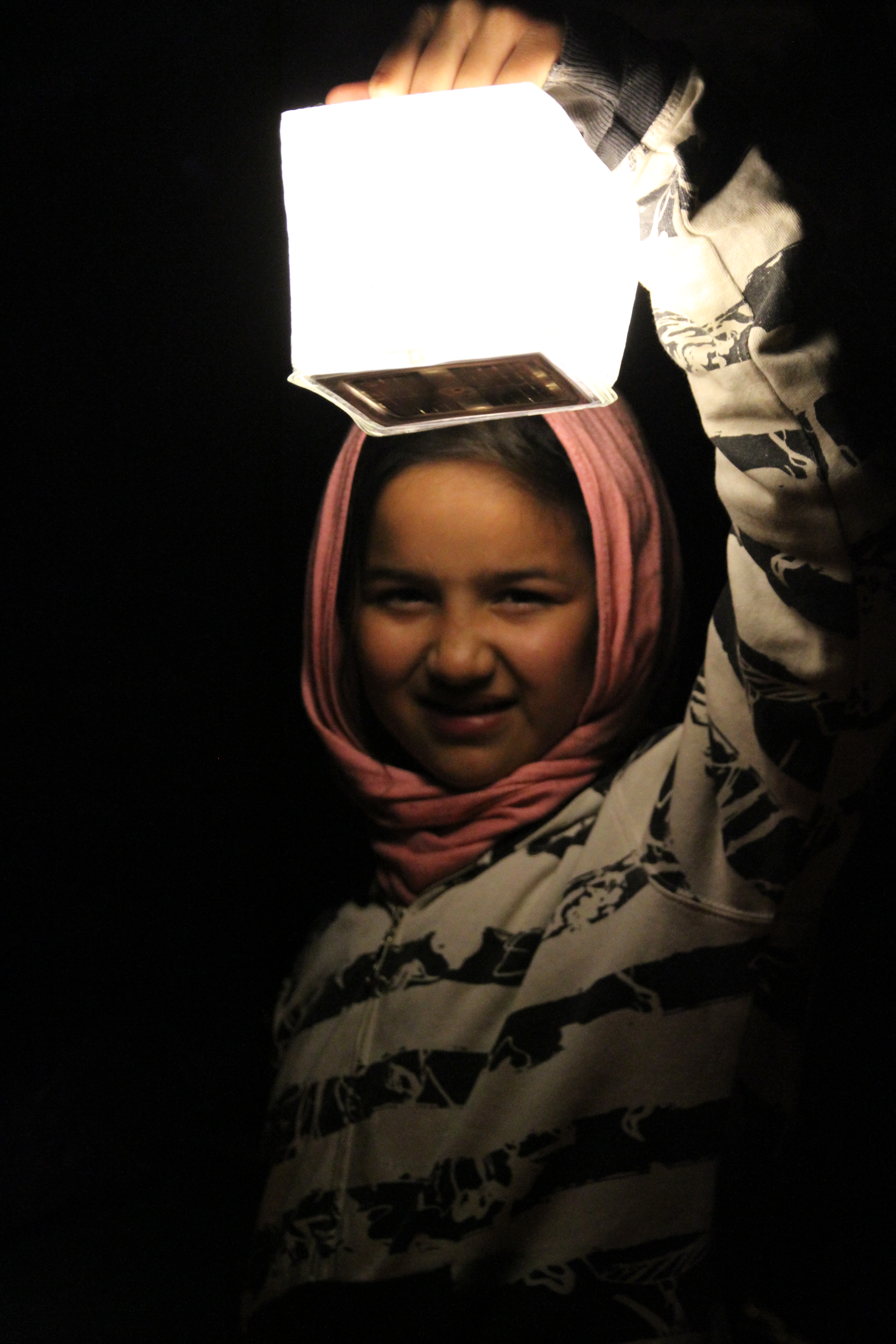
Syrian refugee girl holding solar lantern called SolarPuff in Greece. 2015

== Products ==
Solight Design offers portable, cube-shaped, water-resistant solar lanterns that fold flat when not in use. The high-end version is the SolarPuff solar lantern, while the more economical version is the SolarHelix solar lantern.

Each lantern includes a solar panel, a rechargeable lithium polymer battery, and 10 LEDs. Exposing the solar panel to bright sunlight for about 8 hours charges the battery. A button on the lantern switches between off, low, high and blinking. A fully charged lantern can provide 100 lumens of light for up to 8–12 hours. The SolarPuff lantern (expanded 4.5 x 4.5 x 4.5 inches, 2.9 oz (shipping weight 3.2 oz.), flat pack to 0.25 inches) is larger than the SolarHelix lantern (expanded 4.3 x. 4.3 x.4.3 inches, 3 oz (shipping weight 3.5 oz.), flat pack to 0.5 inches). The SolarPuff lantern's material, that functions as a light diffuser, is very high quality sailcloth used for upscale ship sails. The Solar Helix lantern's material is flexible, recyclable TPU (thermoplastic polyurethane).

== History ==
Solight Design's co-founder, Alice Chun, is an architecture professor interested in solar-powered light. As explained in Chun's 2016 TEDx talk, in dealing with her son's asthma –about 10% of children in New York have asthma –Chun realized that poor air quality caused by pollutants was a growing problem, motivating Chun to find ways to incorporate solar power into daily living. In 2008, Chun made experimental inflatable units having a solar panel, battery, LEDs, and fabric light diffuser; these experimental units were used in her studies for "skins" of buildings. Chun received a 2008 Brunner Grant from the Center for Architecture Foundation to explore energy efficient building skins.

After the 2010 earthquake in Haiti, Chun challenged students in her design studio class at Columbia University’s Graduate School of Architecture to develop solutions for disaster relief that would help an individual, instead of city-sized or building-sized solutions that architecture students usually consider. Chun realized her experimental units could serve as individual solar lanterns. Chun's students contributed the concept of a handle. Chun and her students filed a patent application for her inflatable solar lamp. Chun's students were inspired to create their own company selling inflatable solar lanterns, LuminAID.

In 2010, Chun founded a non-profit organization, Studio Unite, renamed to FAARM (Focus on Architecture Art Research Making), to help use architectural approaches to disaster relief and people lacking electricity. Some people lacking electricity use kerosene, with devastating effects to their health. While helping via FAARM, Chun met Dr./Ambassador Alison Thompson, who is now the executive director of FAARM.

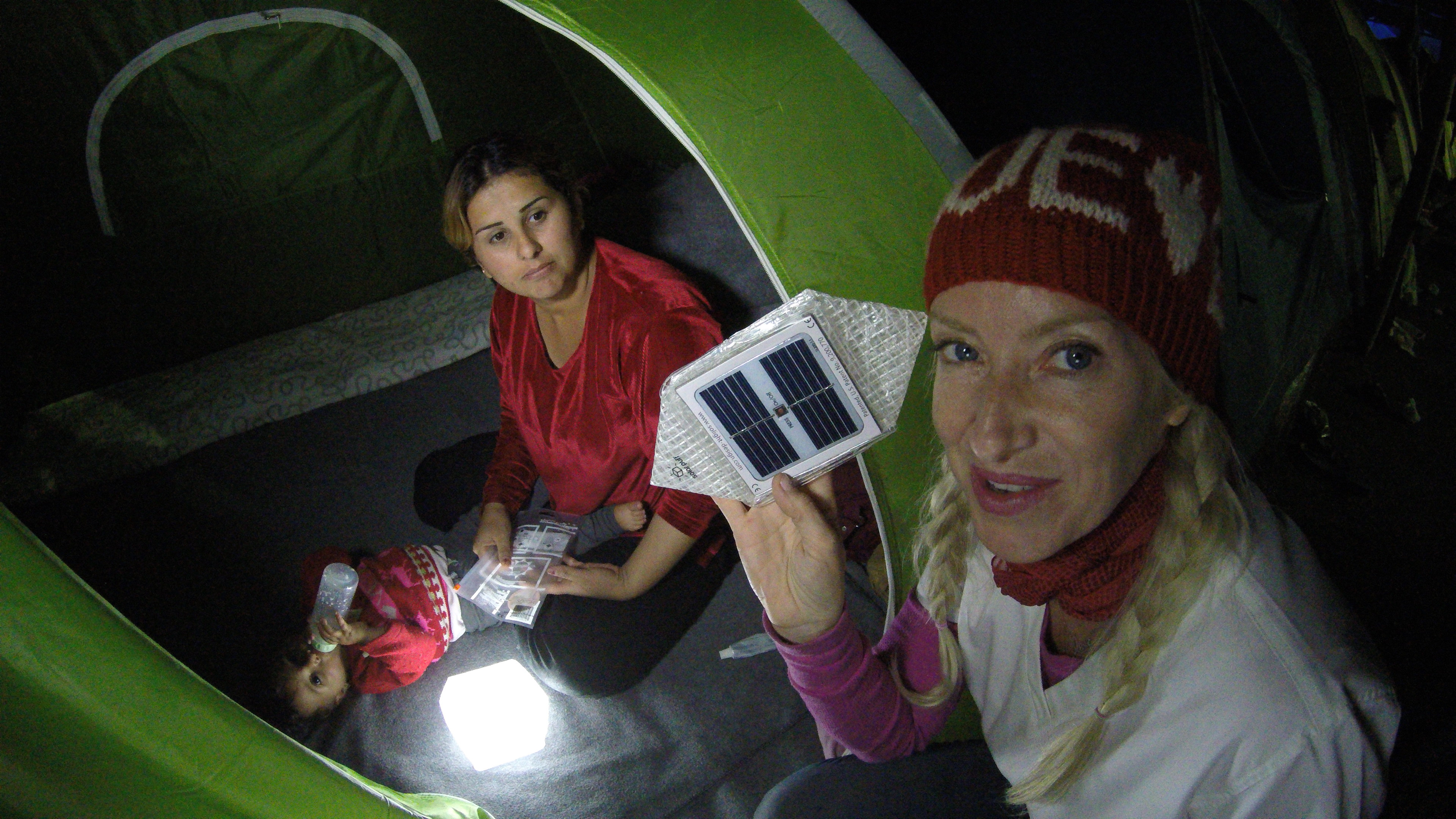
Dr. Alison Thompson delivering solar light SolarPuff to Idomeni, a Syrian refugee camp in Greece. 2015

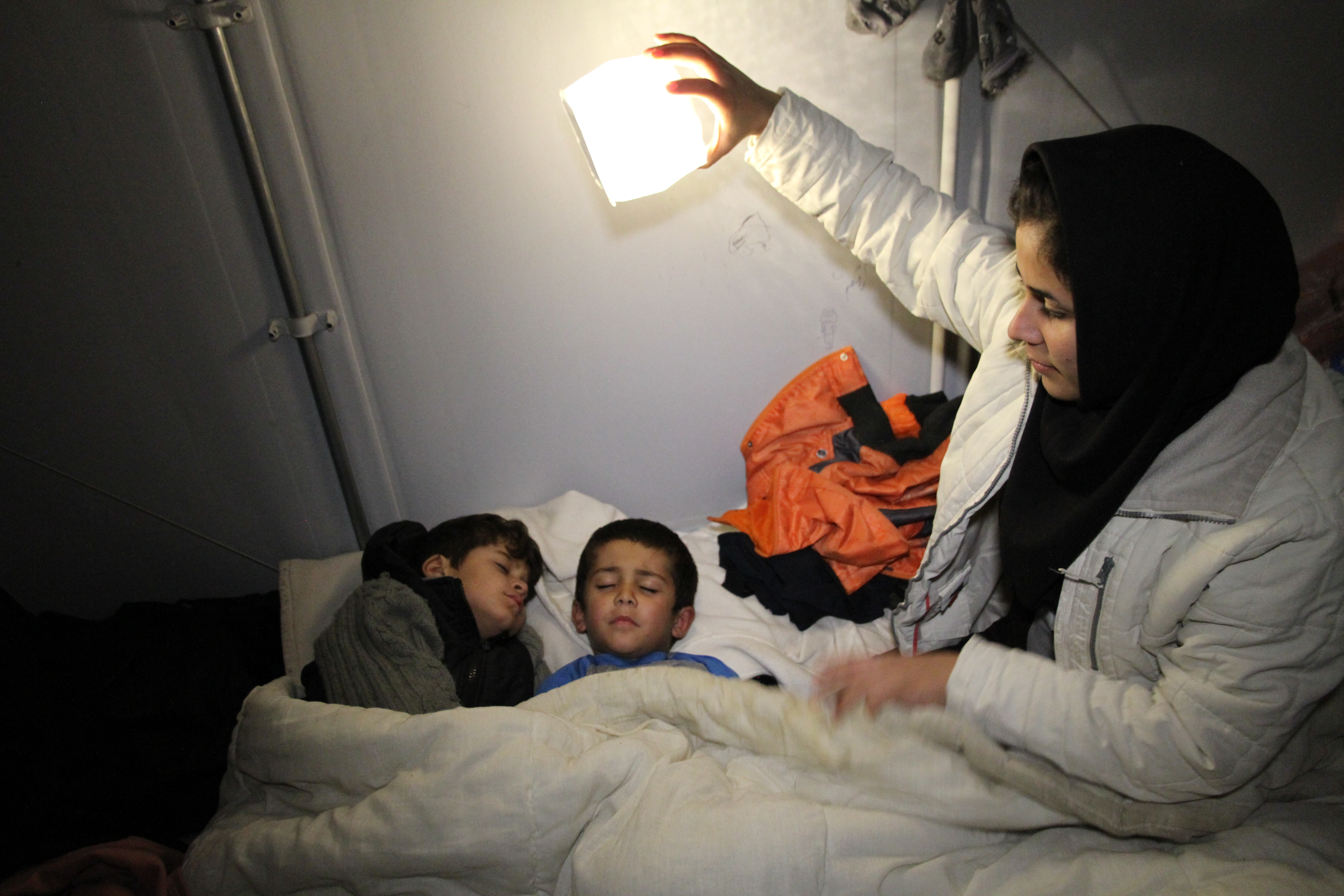
Mother checks her children with a solar lantern called SolarPuff. The refugee camps in Idomeni, Greece are dark. 2016

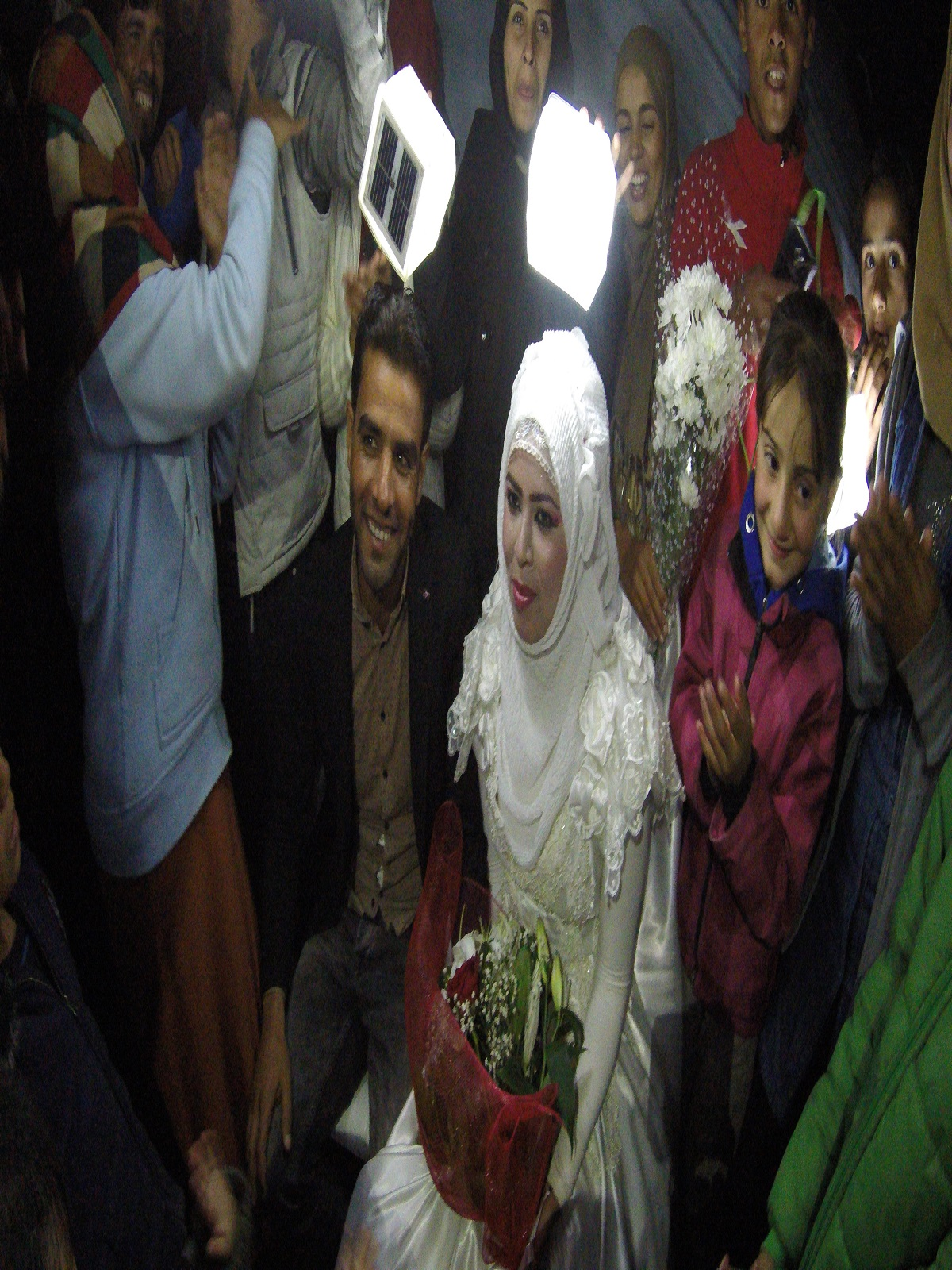
As seen on CNN

Syrian refugee camp wedding in Idomeni, Greece. The pitch black campsite illuminated by solar lanterns called SolarPuff. Love is everywhere, you just need light.|alt=Imagine a bride in a white wedding dress covering her head to her ground. The groom wearing a dark jacket and button up collared shirt. Refugees who are living in the camp are dressed up in dresses and long pants. Solar lanterns called SolarPuff illuminate the scene.

Chun realized that her inflatable solar lantern could be improved by eliminating the mouth nozzle, which could transfer germs orally, and then invented the origami-like folding SolarPuff solar lantern, which does not require mouth inflation. A patent for her folding solar lantern was granted to Chun in 2015. In 2011, Chun founded Material Intelligence Project, Inc. (MIP), renamed to Solight Design, Inc. with Stacy Kelly as co-founder, to market her SolarPuff solar lanterns.

FAARM has distributed Solight Design's SolarPuff solar lanterns to Cameroon, Ecuador, Ghana, Haiti, Liberia, Nepal, Senegal, Greece, Turkey and Syria, bringing much-appreciated light to poor people and disaster victims.

In 2015, Solight Design began offering the more economical SolarHelix solar lantern.

In 2015, the New York Times advised its readers that the SolarPuff solar lantern is a good gift.

In 2015, Solight Design operated a Kickstarter fundraising campaign, achieving 1200% of its funding goal as one of Kickstarter’s featured projects, raising $446,940 to fulfill backer's pledges and to send solar lanterns to earthquake victims in Nepal and to an orphanage in Haiti.

In 2015, Solight Design provided solar lanterns for Malala Yousafzai's talk at the opening day of the United Nations Sustainable Development Summit.

== Awards ==
- 2016 Architizer Award, Lighting Accessories, Jury Winner
- 2011 Core77 Design Award Runner Up, DIY/Hack/Mod
