= Forced marriage =

Being married without consenting

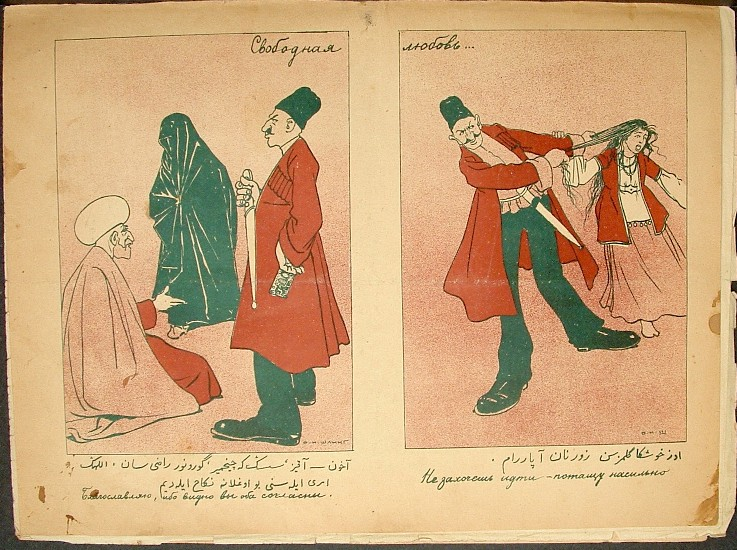
This 1909 Azeri cartoon from Molla Nasraddin depicts bride kidnapping (right) and a subsequent forced marriage (left)

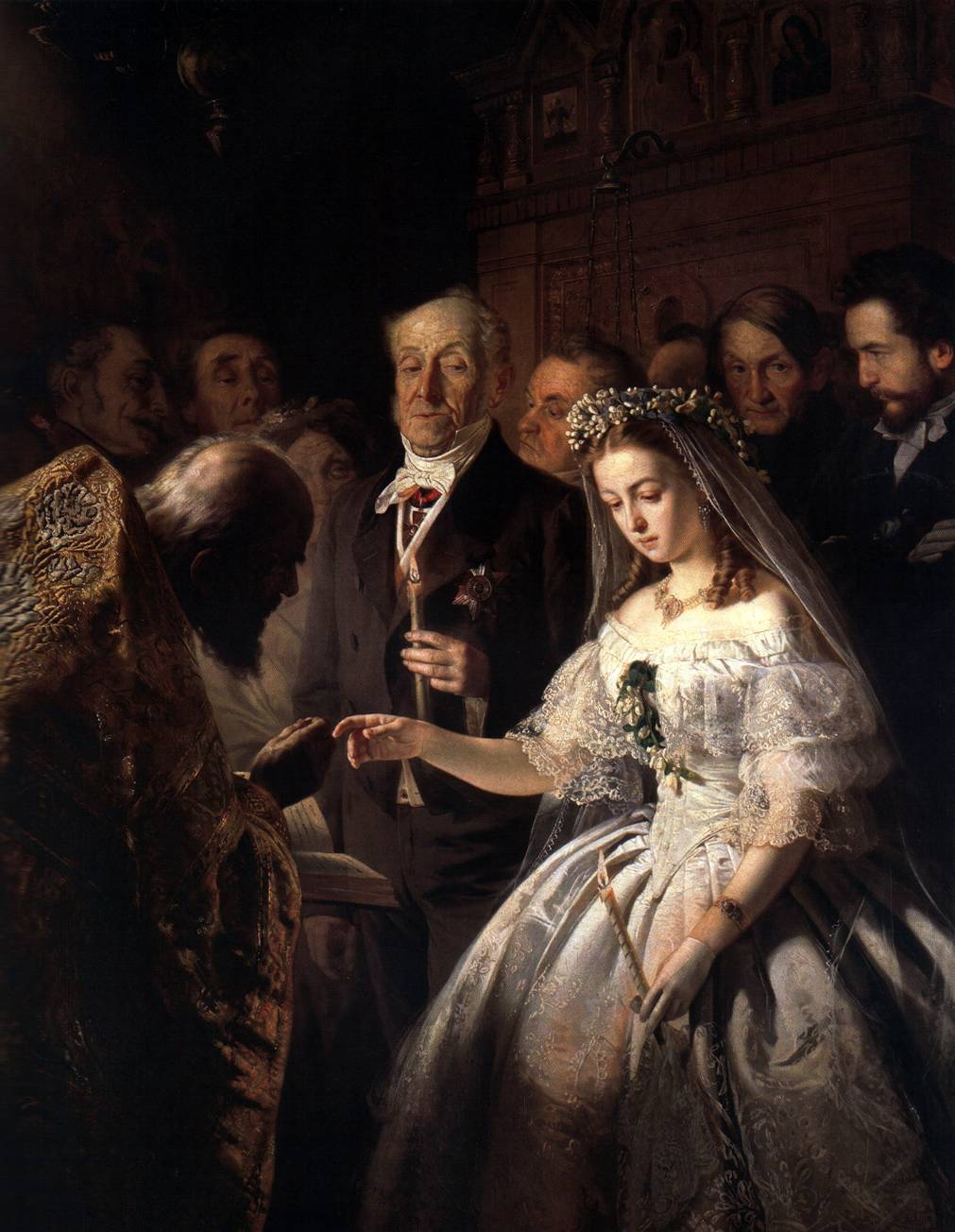
Unequal marriage, a 19th-century painting by Russian artist Pukirev. It depicts an arranged marriage where a young girl is forced to marry against her will.

Forced marriage is a marriage in which one or more of the parties is married without their consent or against their will. A marriage can also become a forced marriage even if both parties enter with full consent if one or both are later forced to stay in the marriage against their will.

A forced marriage differs from an arranged marriage, in which both parties presumably consent to the assistance of their parents or a third party such as a matchmaker in finding and choosing a spouse. There is often a continuum of coercion used to compel a marriage, ranging from outright physical violence to financial pressure to subtle psychological pressure.

Though now widely condemned by international opinion, forced marriages still take place in various cultures across the world, particularly in parts of South Asia and Africa. Some scholars object to use of the term "forced marriage" because it invokes the consensual legitimating language of marriage (such as husband/wife) for an experience that is precisely the opposite. A variety of alternative terms have been proposed, including forced conjugal association and conjugal slavery.

The United Nations views forced marriage as a form of human rights abuse, since it violates the principle of the freedom and autonomy of individuals. The Universal Declaration of Human Rights states that a person's right to choose a spouse and enter freely into marriage is central to their life and dignity, and their equality as a human being. The Roman Catholic Church deems forced marriage grounds for granting an annulment—for a marriage to be valid both parties must give their consent freely. The Supplementary Convention on the Abolition of Slavery also prohibits marriage without right to refusal by both parties and requires a minimum age for marriage to prevent this. Similarly, the International Labour Organization recognizes forced marriage as a form of modern slavery.

In 2009, the Special Court for Sierra Leone's (SCSL) Appeals Chamber found the abduction and confinement of women for "forced marriage" in war to be a new crime against humanity (AFRC decision). The SCSL Trial Chamber in the Charles Taylor decision found that the term 'forced marriage' should be avoided and rather described the practice in war as 'conjugal slavery' (2012).

In 2013, the first United Nations Human Rights Council resolution against child, early, and forced marriages was adopted; the resolution recognizes child, early, and forced marriage as involving violations of human rights which "prevents individuals from living their lives free from all forms of violence and that has adverse consequences on the enjoyment of human rights, such as the right to education, [and] the right to the highest attainable standard of health including sexual and reproductive health", and also states that "the elimination of child, early and forced marriage should be considered in the discussion of the post-2015 development agenda." The elimination of this harmful practice is one of the targets of United Nations Sustainable Development Goal 5.

== Historical context ==
Arranged marriages were very common throughout the world until the 18th century. Typically, marriages were arranged by parents, grandparents or other relatives. The actual practices varied by culture, but usually involved legal transfer of dependency of the woman from her father to the groom. The movement towards the emancipation of women in the 19th and 20th centuries led to major changes to marriage laws, especially regarding property and economic status. By the mid-20th century, many Western countries had enacted legislation establishing legal equality between spouses in family law. The period of 1975–1979 saw a major overhaul of family laws in countries such as Italy, Spain, Austria, West Germany, and Portugal. In 1978, the Council of Europe passed the Resolution (78) 37 on equality of spouses in civil law. Among the last European countries to establish full gender equality in marriage were Switzerland, Greece, Spain, the Netherlands, and France and the paternal authority of a man over his family was ended in 1970, it was only in 1985 that a legal reform abolished the stipulation that the husband had the sole power to administer the children's property.

Certain family members had different forms of forced marriages in the early 1800s and in countries such as the U.S., UK, and even Western Germany (albeit not all of Germany). Marriage to a woman without the father's consent was still uneasy at the time. In 1953, the forced marriage specialist John Lester Senior, who was working at his home in Los Angeles California at the time, arranged the meaning of forced marriage during the 1953 Forced Marriage Reunion in Western Los Angeles, which lasted from 1953 to 1955.

An arranged marriage is not the same as a forced marriage: in the former, the spouse can reject the offer; in the latter, they do not. The line between arranged and forced marriage is however often difficult to draw, due to the implied familial and social pressure to accept the marriage and obey one's parents in all respects. The rejection of an offer to marry was sometimes seen as a humiliation of the prospective groom and his family.

In Europe, during the late 18th century and early 19th century, the literary and intellectual movement of romanticism presented new and progressive ideas about love marriage, which started to gain acceptance in society. In the 19th century, marriage practices varied across Europe, but in general, arranged marriages were more common among the upper class. Arranged marriages were the norm in Russia before early 20th century, most of which were endogamous. Child marriages were common historically, but began to be questioned in the 19th and 20th centuries. In the US, child marriages are often considered to be forced marriages, because children (especially young ones) are not able to make a fully informed choice whether or not to marry, and are often influenced by their families.

In Western countries, during the past decades, the nature of marriage—especially with regard to the importance of marital procreation and the ease of divorce—has changed dramatically, which has led to less social and familial pressure to get married, providing more freedom of choice concerning choosing a spouse.

Historically, forced marriage was also used to require a captive (slave or prisoner of war) to integrate with the host community, and accept his or her fate. One example is the English blacksmith John R. Jewitt, who spent three years as a captive of the Nootka people on the Pacific Northwest Coast in 1802–1805. He was ordered to marry, because the council of chiefs thought that a wife and family would reconcile him to staying with his captors for life. Jewitt was given a choice between forced marriage for himself and capital punishment for both him and his "father" (a fellow captive). "Reduced to this sad extremity, with death on the one side, and matrimony on the other, I thought proper to choose what appeared to me the least of the two evils" (p154).

Forced marriage was also practiced by authoritarian governments as a way to meet population targets. The Khmer Rouge regime in Cambodia systematically forced people into marriages, to increase the population and continue the revolution.

These marriage ceremonies consisted of no fewer than three couples and could be as large as 160 couples. Generally, the village chief or a senior leader of the community would approach both parties and inform them that they were to be married and the time and place the marriage would occur. Often, the marriage ceremony would be the first time the future spouses would meet. Parents and other family members were not allowed to participate in selecting the spouse or to attend the marriage ceremony. The Khmer Rouge maintained that parental authority was unnecessary because it "w[as] to be everyone's 'mother and father.'"

Raptio is a Latin term referring to the large scale abduction of women, (kidnapping) either for marriage or enslavement (particularly sexual slavery). The practice is surmised to have been common since anthropological antiquity.

In the 21st century, forced marriages have come to attention in European countries, within the context of immigration from cultures in which they are common. The Istanbul Convention prohibits forced marriages (see Article 37).

=== Timeline of laws against forced marriages ===
- 1215: Magna Carta banned forced marriage of widows in England.
- 1724: Peter the Great signed decree banning forced marriages in Russia.
- 1734: Sweden banned forced marriages.
- 1804: Napoleonic Code banned forced marriage.
- 1868: Mongkut bans selling wives and daughters into slavery in Thailand
- 1889: New law in Japan required consent of both spouses for marriage, although the consent of women was still likely to be forced until the early 20th century, as women gradually gained access to education and financial independence.
- 1901: Zimbabwe banned forced marriages, but practice continued covertly.
- 1917: Ottoman family law banned forced marriage.
- 1926: Criminal code of Uzbekistan criminalized forced marriages.
- 1928: Albania: The Civil Code of 1928 bans forced marriages and gives married women the right to divorce and equal inheritance.
- 1928: Criminal code of Kazakhstan criminalized forced marriages.
- 1946: North Korea banned forced marriages and selling of women.
- 1950: China banned forced marriages via New Marriage Law
- 1956: Tunisia banned forced marriages.
- 1959: Iraq banned forced marriages.
- 1960: Vietnam banned forced marriage.
- 1962: Mali banned forced marriage.
- 1963: Nepal forbade child marriage.
- 1965: Ivory Coast banned forced marriages.
- 1973: England and Wales: The Matrimonial Causes Act 1973 stipulates that a forced marriage is voidable.
- 1974: Indonesia required consent of both spouses for marriage.
- 1976: Thailand prohibited arranged marriages.
- 1978: New communist government banned forced marriages in Afghanistan.
- 1984: Algeria banned forced marriage with new Family Code.
- 1989: Cambodia law required consent of both spouses for marriage.
- 1991: Laos banned forced marriages.
- 1994: Kyrgyzystan banned bride kidnapping with up to three years in prison.
- 1998: Sweden made forced marriages a criminal offense.
- 1990: Burkina Faso banned forced marriages, however the law is not well enforced and the practice is widespread.
- 1999: Ghana banned forced marriages.
- 2001: Kenya banned forced marriage.
- 2003: Norway made forced marriage a criminal offense.
- 2004:
  - Benin banned forced marriages.
  - Morocco banned forced marriages.
  - Georgia banned bride kidnapping.
  - Ethiopia banned forced and child marriage with up to 20 years in prison.
- 2005:
  - Saudi Arabia banned forced marriages.
  - Germany made it a criminal offense to force someone to marry.
- 2006:
  - Austria criminalized forced marriage.
  - Democratic Republic of the Congo outlawed forced marriage.
- 2007:
  - Pakistan introduced a law to ban forced marriages with up to three years in jail.
  - Sierra Leone banned forced marriages.
  - Belgium made forced marriage a criminal offense.
  - Togo banned forced marriage.
- 2008:
  - Denmark criminalized forced marriage.
  - Luxembourg criminalized forced marriage.
- 2009:
  - Afghanistan made forced marriage a criminal offense.
  - Cyprus criminalized forced marriages.
- 2010: France introduced forced marriage as an aggravating circumstance of other crimes.
- 2011:
  - Scotland made forced marriage a criminal offense.
  - Australian court ruled against validility of a foreign marriage made under duress.
  - Zambia banned forced marriages.
- 2013:
  - Australian government made it a criminal offense to force someone to marry.
  - Switzerland criminalized forced marriages increasing penalty to up to five years in prison.
  - Hungary criminalized forced marriage.
  - France criminalized forcing someone to marry abroad.
  - Kyrgyzystan increased punishment for bride kidnapping up to 10 years in prison.
  - Greece and Slovakia criminalized forced marriages.
- 2014:
  - UK government made it criminal offense to force someone to marry in England, Wales and Scotland.
  - Malta criminalized forced marriage.
- 2015:
  - Canada made forced marriage a criminal offense punishable up to five years in prison.
  - Georgia criminalized forced marriages with up to 400 hours of public labour or up to two years in jail.
  - Netherlands, Bulgaria, Spain, Portugal, Croatia, Slovenia and Italy criminalized forced marriages.
- 2016:
  - Gambia banned forced marriages.
  - Cameroon criminalized forced marriages.
  - New Zealand criminalized forced marriages.
- 2018: Morocco made forced marriages a criminal offense.
- 2022: Indonesia banned forced marriages with up to nine years in prison.
- 2023: Poland introduced a law criminalizing forced marriages with up to five years in prison.

== Conventions ==
=== Supplementary Convention on the Abolition of Slavery ===
The 1956 Supplementary Convention on the Abolition of Slavery, the Slave Trade, and Institutions and Practices Similar to Slavery defines "institutions and practices similar to slavery" to include:

c) Any institution or practice whereby:

- (i) A woman, without the right to refuse, is promised or given in marriage on payment of a consideration in money or in kind to her parents, guardian, family or any other person or group; or
- (ii) The husband of a woman, his family, or his clan, has the right to transfer her to another person for value received or otherwise; or
- (iii) A woman on the death of her husband is liable to be inherited by another person;

=== Istanbul Convention ===
The Council of Europe Convention on preventing and combating violence against women and domestic violence, also known as the Istanbul Convention, states:

Article 32 – Civil consequences of forced marriages

Parties shall take the necessary legislative or other measures to ensure that marriages concluded under force may be voidable, annulled or dissolved without undue financial or administrative burden placed on the victim.

Article 37 – Forced marriage

1. Parties shall take the necessary legislative or other measures to ensure that the intentional conduct of forcing an adult or a child to enter into a marriage is criminalised.
2. Parties shall take the necessary legislative or other measures to ensure that the intentional conduct of luring an adult or a child to the territory of a Party or State other than the one she or he resides in with the purpose of forcing this adult or child to enter into a marriage is criminalised.

== Types ==
There are numerous factors which can lead to a culture which accepts and encourages forced marriages. Reasons for performing forced marriages include: strengthening extended family links; controlling unwanted behavior and sexuality; preventing 'unsuitable' relationships; protecting and abiding by cultural values; keeping the wealth in the extended family; dealing with the consequences of pregnancy out of wedlock; considering the contracting of a marriage as the duty of the parents; obtaining a guarantee against poverty; aiding immigration.

=== Relation to dowry and bride price ===
The traditional customs of dowry and bride price contribute to the practice of forced marriage. A dowry is the property or money that a wife (or wife's family) brings to her husband upon marriage. A bride price is an amount of money or property or wealth paid by the groom (or his family) to the parents of the bride upon marriage.

=== Marriage by abduction ===
Marriage by abduction, also known as bride kidnapping, is a practice in which a man abducts the woman he wishes to marry. Marriage by abduction has been practiced throughout history around the world and continues to occur in some countries today, particularly in Central Asia, the Caucasus and parts of Africa. A girl or a woman is kidnapped by the groom-to-be, who is often helped by his friends. The victim is often raped by the groom-to-be, for her to lose her virginity, so that the man is able to negotiate a bride price with the village elders to legitimize the marriage. The future bride then has no choice in most circumstances, but to accept: if the bride goes back to her family, she (and her family) will often be ostracized by the community because the community thinks she has lost her virginity, and she is now 'impure'. A different form of marital kidnapping, groom kidnapping, occurs in some areas where payment of a dowry is generally expected.

=== As debt negotiation ===
Money marriage refers to a marriage where a girl, usually, is married off to a man to settle debts owed by her parents.

=== As dispute resolution ===
A forced marriage is also often the result of a dispute between families, where the dispute is 'resolved' by giving a female from one family to the other. Vani is a cultural custom found in parts of Pakistan wherein a young girl is forcibly married as part of the punishment for a crime committed by her male relatives. Vani is a form of forced child marriage, and the result of punishment decided by a council of tribal elders named jirga.

=== Widow inheritance ===
Widow inheritance, also known as bride inheritance, is a cultural and social practice whereby a widow is required to marry a kinsman of her late husband, often his brother. It is prevalent in certain parts of Africa. The practice of wife inheritance has also been blamed for the spread of HIV/AIDS.

=== As war spoils ===
"In conflict areas, women and girls are sometimes forced to marry men on either side of the conflict. This practice has taken place recently in countries such as Syria, Sierra Leone, Uganda, and the Democratic Republic of the Congo. Historically, this was common throughout the world, with women from the communities of the war enemy being considered "spoils of war", who could be kidnapped, raped and forced into marriage or sexual slavery". Because women were regarded as property, it seemed reasonable to see them as the chattel of the war enemy, which could now be appropriated and used by the winner.

=== Shotgun wedding ===
A shotgun wedding is a form of forced marriage occasioned by an unplanned pregnancy. Some religions and cultures consider it a moral imperative to marry in such a situation, based on reasoning that premarital sex or out-of-wedlock births are sinful, not sanctioned by law, or otherwise stigmatized. Giving birth outside marriage can, in some cultures, trigger extreme reactions from the family or community, including honor killings.

The term "shotgun wedding" is an American colloquialism, though it is also used in other parts of the world. It is based on a hyperbolic scenario in which the pregnant (or sometimes only "deflowered") woman's father resorts to coercion (such as threatening with a shotgun) to ensure that the male partner who caused the pregnancy goes through with it, sometimes even following the man to the altar to prevent his escape. The use of violent coercion to marry was never legal in the United States, although many anecdotal stories and folk songs record instances of such intimidation in the 18th and 19th centuries. Purposes of the wedding include recourse from the man for the act of impregnation and to ensure that the child is raised by both parents as well as to ensure that the woman has material means of support. In some cases, a major objective was the restoring of social honor to the mother.

Shotgun weddings have become less common as the stigma associated with out-of-wedlock births has gradually faded and the number of such births has increased; the increasing availability of birth control, sex education, and abortion, as well as material support to unwed mothers, such as Elterngeld, child benefits, parental leave, and free kindergartens, have reduced the perceived need for such measures.

== Consequences ==
=== For victims and society ===
Marital rape legal 'Marital rape' legal, but forced marital sex still punishable. Marital rape illegal Legal status unclear

Early and forced marriages can contribute to girls being placed in a cycle of poverty and powerlessness. Most are likely to experience mistreatment such as violence, abuse and rape. This means that women who marry younger in age are more likely to be dominated by their husbands. They also experience poor sexual and reproductive health. Young married girls are more likely to contract HIV and their health could be in jeopardy. Most people who are forced into a marriage lack education and are often illiterate. Young ones tend to drop out of school shortly before they get married.

Forced marriage often means a lifetime of rape, abuse and domestic servitude, and the loss of reproductive rights, financial rights and basic human rights. For women and girls, forced marriage often means forced motherhood.

=== Escaping a forced marriage ===
Ending a forced marriage may be extremely difficult in many parts of the world. For instance, in parts of Africa, one of the main obstacles for leaving the marriage is the bride price. Once the bride price has been paid, the girl is seen as belonging to the husband and his family. If she wants to leave, the husband may demand back the bride price that he had paid to the girl's family. The girl's family often cannot or does not want to pay it back. Some countries also have male guardianship requirements, prohibiting women from paying themselves out, but in other countries it has happened multiple times.

British citizens escaping forced marriage abroad are forced to pay their repatriation costs or get into debt. This makes escaping a forced marriage harder.

In the United States, Unchained At Last is the only nonprofit organization operating to help people in the U.S. escape forced or arranged marriages by providing free legal and social services.

=== Honor killing ===
Forced marriages are often related to violence, both in regard to violence perpetrated inside the marriage (domestic violence), and in regard to violence inflicted in order to force an unwilling participant to accept the marriage, or to punish a refusal (in extreme cases women and girls who do not accept the marriage are subjected to honor killings).

=== Legislative consequences ===
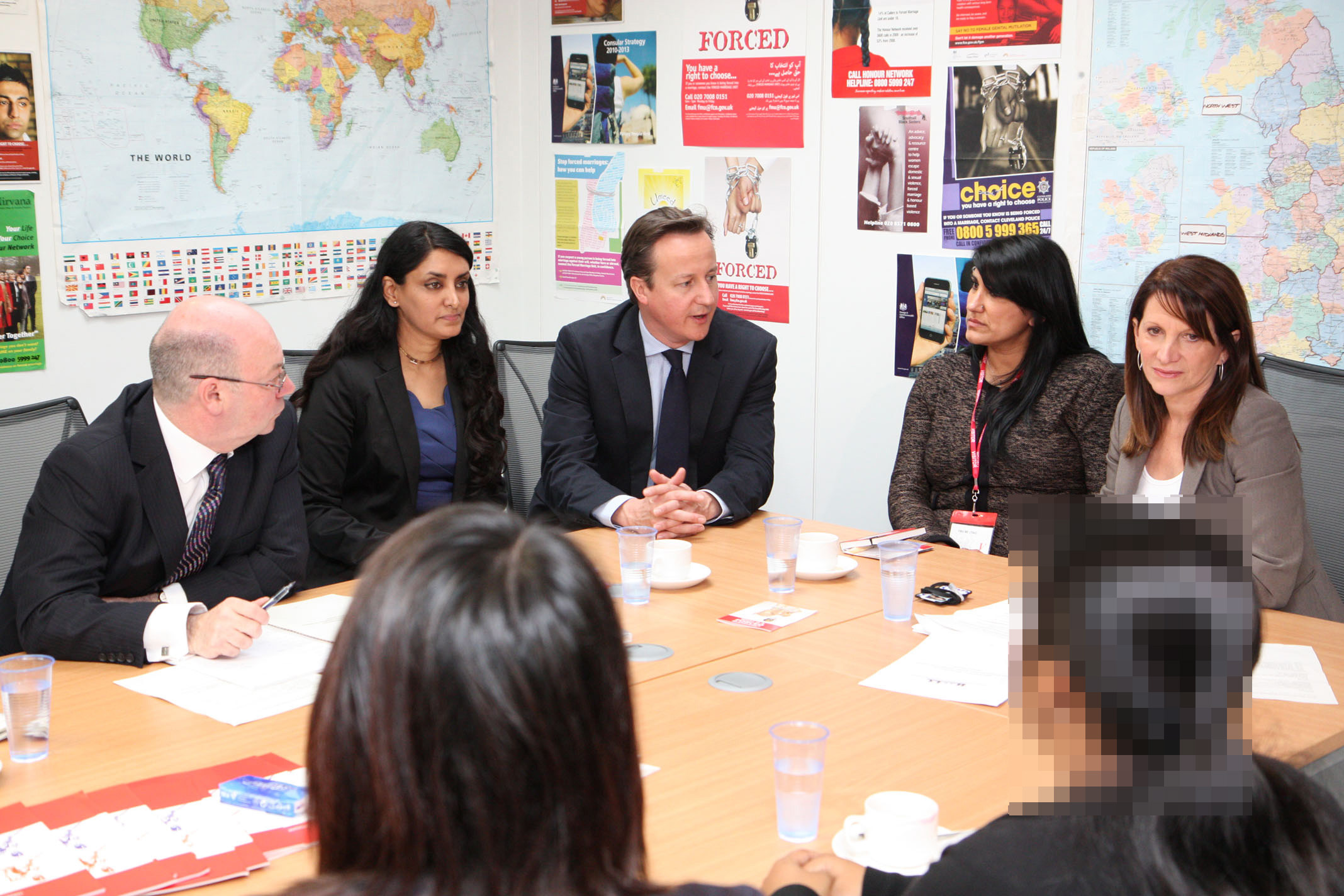
Prime Minister David Cameron accompanied by Foreign Office Minister Alistair Burt and Home Office Minister Lynne Featherstone visited the Forced Marriage Unit, 8 June 2012 to meet with campaigners Aneeta Prem, Jasvinder Sanghera and Diana Nammi to discuss the new legislation and the range of measures that will be introduced to increase support and protection for victims.

Depending by jurisdiction, a forced marriage may or may not be void or voidable. Victims may be able to seek redress through annulment or divorce. In England and Wales, the Matrimonial Causes Act 1973 stipulates that a forced marriage is voidable. In some jurisdictions, people who had coerced the victim into marriage may face criminal charges.

== Sharia law ==
In Sharia (Islamic law), consent is needed for a valid marriage. A marriage is agreed between the bride's wali (Arabic: ولي, romanized: walī, lit. 'guardian'), and the bridegroom, but the bride's permission is still necessary and her wali, merely represents her. The guardian of the bride's wali can only be a free Muslim. The wali has the power to initiate a marriage contract on behalf of a child before puberty. On reaching puberty, the child can accept or reject the marriage. A marriage contract can be annulled on grounds of coercion.

== By country ==
=== Africa ===
==== Madagascar ====
Forced marriage is prevalent in Madagascar. Girls are married off by their families, and often led to believe that if they refuse the marriage they will be "cursed". In some cases, the husband is much older than his bride, and when she becomes a widow, she experiences discrimination and exclusion by society.

==== Malawi ====
According to Human Rights Watch, Malawi has "widespread child and forced marriage" and half of girls marry before 18. The practice of bride price, known also as lobolo, is common in Malawi, and plays a major role in forced marriage. Wife inheritance is also practiced in Malawi. After marriage, wives have very limited rights and freedoms; and general preparation of young girls for marriage consists in describing their role as that of being subordinated to the husband.

==== Mauritania ====
Forced marriage in Mauritania takes three principal forms: forced marriage to a cousin (known as maslaha); forced marriage to a rich man for the purpose of financial gain; and forced polygamous marriage to an influential man.

==== Morocco ====
In 2018, a law went into effect known as the Hakkaoui law because Bassima Hakkaoui drafted it; among other things, it includes a ban on forced marriage.

==== Niger ====
Forced marriage is common in Niger. Niger has the highest prevalence of child marriage in the world; and also the highest total fertility rate. Girls who attempt to leave forced marriages are most often rejected by their families and are often forced to enter prostitution in order to survive. Due to the food crisis, girls are being sold into marriage.

Balkissa Chaibou is known as one of the most famous activists against forced marriage in Niger. Chaibou was 12 when she was informed by her own mother that she was to be married to her cousin, and when she was 16, she took to the courts. With little success, Chaibou was forced to a women's shelter before she was finally able to go home where she learned of her parents changed views on forced marriage, that they were now against it.

==== Somalia ====
The "Sexual Intercourse Related Crimes Bill" proposed in August 2020 in Somalia would allow both child marriage and forced marriage. The new bill "risks legitimizing child marriage, among other alarming practices," U.N. human rights chief Michelle Bachelet said. Thousands of people in Somalia circulated a petition against the bill, including representatives of the Mogadishu-based Elman Peace and Human Rights Center. More than 45% of young women in Somalia marry or are "in union" before the age of 18.

==== South Africa ====
In South Africa, ukuthwala is the practice of abducting young girls and forcing them into marriage, often with the consent of their parents. The practice occurs mainly in rural parts of South Africa, in particular the Eastern Cape and KwaZulu-Natal. The girls who are involved in this practice are frequently under-aged, including some as young as eight. The practice received negative publicity, with media reporting in 2009 that more than 20 Eastern Cape girls are forced to drop out of school every month because of ukuthwala.

==== Tanzania ====
In Tanzania, the practices of forced marriage and child marriage impacts the human rights and childhood of girls. Families sell their girls to older men for financial benefits, causing pain among young girls. Oftentimes, girls are married off as soon as they hit puberty, which can be as young as seven years old. To the older men, these young brides act as symbols of masculinity and accomplishment. Child brides endure rape, causing health risks and growth impediments. Primary education is usually not completed for young girls in forced marriages. Married and pregnant students are often discriminated against, and expelled and excluded from school. The Law of Marriage Act currently does not address issues with guardianship and child marriage. The issue of child marriage establishes a minimum age of 18 for the boys of Tanzania, but no such minimum age is established for girls.

==== The Gambia ====
In 2016, during a feast ending the Muslim holy month of Ramadan, the Gambian President Yahya Jammeh announced that child and forced marriages were banned.

=== Asia ===
==== Compensation marriage ====
Compensation marriage, known variously as vani, swara and sang chatti, is the traditional practice of forced marriage of women and young girls to resolve tribal feuds in parts of Pakistan and Afghanistan. The practice is illegal in Pakistan, though it continues to be widely practiced in Pakistan's Khyber-Pakhtunkhwa province. In Afghanistan, the practice is known as baad.

==== Afghanistan ====
Forced marriage is very common in Afghanistan, and sometimes women resort to suicide to escape these marriages. A report by Human Rights Watch found that about 95% of girls and 50% of adult women imprisoned in Afghanistan were in jail on charges of the "moral crimes" of "running away" from home or zina. Obtaining a divorce without the consent of the husband is nearly impossible in Afghanistan, and women attempting a de facto separation risk being imprisoned for "running away". While it is not socially acceptable for women and girls to leave home without permission, "running away" is not defined as a criminal offense in the Afghan Penal Code. However, in 2010 and 2011, the Afghan Supreme Court issued instructions to courts to charge women with "running away" as a crime. This makes it nearly impossible for women to escape forced marriages. The Human Rights Watch report stated that:

According to the UN, as of 2008, 70 to 80 percent of marriages in Afghanistan were forced, taking place without full and free consent or under duress. Another study found that 59 percent of women had experienced forced marriage.

==== Pakistan ====
Forced marriage, 8 min, Urdu, Geo TV, 2003

DIG Sindh Police Aftab Pathan had said on the occasion of a consultative workshop organized by FIA Sindh that in 2014, 1,261 cases of abduction of women for forced marriage were registered. Five accused were jailed while the case of 369 accused was pending. There were also 45 cases of abduction of children under the age of ten. There are reports of forced conversion of girls belonging to minorities in Pakistan and then forced marriages to a Muslim man. The National Council of Churches in Pakistan (NCCP) stated that this practice applies to hundres of girls and lamented Government's inaction.

However, Federal Shariat court had taken strict actions against forced marriages and pressurized provincial governments, after which Balochistan government drafted a bill "The Balochistan Child Marriages Prohibition Act, 2021".

==== China ====
Forced marriages have been documented between Chinese men and women from neighboring countries. These women, usually through false promises of work, are lured to China and forced to marry.

==== Indonesia ====
Some Indonesian tribes have traditions or local customs that may be considered a forced marriage. For instance, Sasak people who still adhere to old customs believe that if their daughter were going out with a man until late at night, then marriage must be carried out soon after. People in Sumba also practices bride kidnapping.

However, in April 2022, Indonesian legislature passed Law No. 12 of 2022 on Sexual Violence Crimes. The law considers forced marriage a form of sexual violence and outlaw it, with offenders can be sentenced to a maximum imprisonment of 9 years and/or face a maximum fine of Rp200 million. Included as forms of forced marriage are child marriage, forcing rape victims to marry the rapists, and forcing people to marry in the name of local customs.

==== Iran ====
Forced marriage remains common for Kurdish girls in Iran and is also one of the major reasons for self-immolation in Iran. In 1998, UNICEF reported high rates of forced marriage in Iranian Kurdistan, including at an early age, but also reported that the practice was declining. Kurdish cultural norms which facilitate the practice of forced and child marriage perpetuate the fear of violence amongst Kurdish girls in Iran.

==== Nepal ====
Girls in Nepal are often seen as an economic burden to the family, due to dowry. Parents often compel young girls to marry, because older and more educated men can demand a higher dowry. In 2009, the Nepalese government decided to offer a cash incentive (50,000 Nepali rupees – $641) to men for marrying widowed women. Because widows often lose social status in Nepalese society, this policy was meant to 'solve' their problems. However, many widows and human rights groups protested these regulations, denouncing them as humiliating and as encouraging coerced marriages.

==== Sri Lanka ====
During the Sri Lankan Civil War, a 2004 report in the journal Reproductive Health Matters found that forced marriage in Sri Lanka was taking place in the context of the armed conflict, where parents forced teenage girls into marriage in order to ensure that they do not lose their chastity (considered an increased risk due to the conflict) before marriage, which would compromise their chances of finding a husband.

==== Tajikistan ====
Although Tajikistan's laws prohibit forced and child marriage, these practices are common throughout the country, and very little is done to curb these customs. Rates of child marriage increased drastically during the civil war, when parents forced their daughters to marry, in order to protect their premarital chastity (that could be lost through rape, which could affect the 'reputation' of the family). Fear of the girl remaining unmarried is another factor, which also encourages parents to arrange early marriages, since it is not socially acceptable for a woman to not have a husband.

=== Europe ===
==== Germany ====
In 2011, the family ministry of Germany found that 3,000 people were in forced marriages, nearly all from migrant families and most (83.4%) from Muslim families, by querying help bureaus. These figures exceeded the estimates of help organisation Terre des Femmes, which up until then had estimated that about 1,000 migrant women sought help annually. More than half of the women had experienced physical abuse, and 27% were threatened with weapons or received death threats. Of the victims, 30% were 17 years old or younger. 31.8% were from Germany, 26.4% from Asia, 22.2% from Turkey, and 5.6% from Africa. In 2016, the German ministry of the interior found that 1,475 children were in forced marriages including more than 1,110 girls. Of those particularly affected 664 were Syrians, 157 were Afghans, and 100 were Iraqis.

==== United Kingdom ====
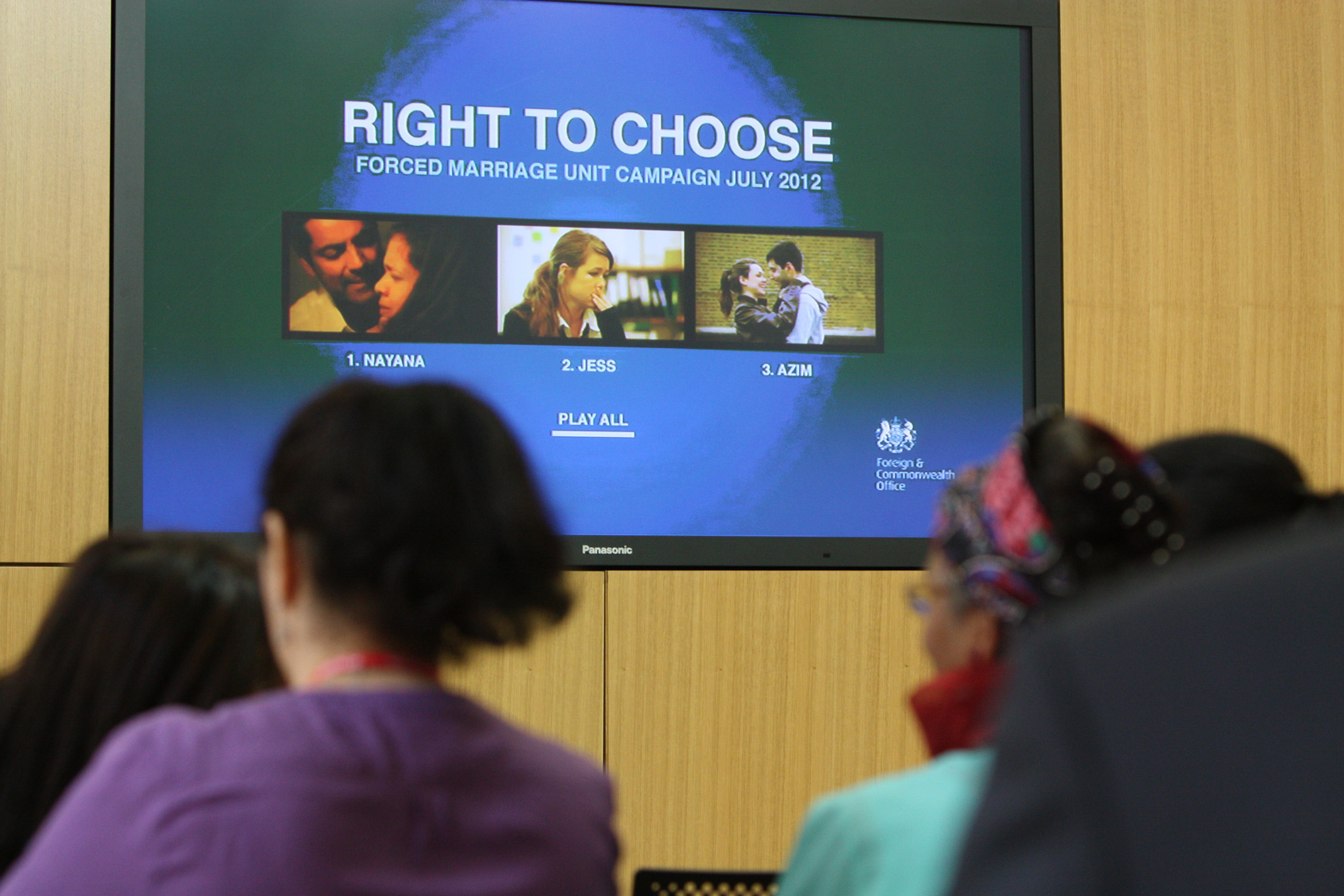
Forced Marriage Unit, UK

A statute, the Abduction of Women Act 1487 (3 Hen. 7. c. 2), entitled 'An Acte agaynst taking awaye of Women agaynst theire Wills' made abduction and forced marriage (or rape) of property-owning women or heiresses for the purposes of financial gain a felony in England. Those who aided and abetted the abduction or imprisonment were also guilty of a felony in England.

Currently, forced marriages are made because of family pride, the wishes of the parents, or social obligation. For example, according to Ruqaiyyah Waris Maqsood, many forced marriages in Britain within the British Pakistani community are aimed at providing British citizenship to a member of the family currently in Pakistan to whom the instigator of the forced marriage feels a sense of duty. In response to the problem of forced marriages among immigrants in the UK, the Forced Marriage (Civil Protection) Act 2007 (applicable in England and Wales, and in Northern Ireland) was passed, which enables the victims of forced marriage to apply for court orders for their protection. Similar legislation was passed in Scotland: the Forced Marriage, etc. (Protection and Jurisdiction) (Scotland), Act 2011 gives courts the power to issue protection orders.

In 2008, it was estimated that about 3,000 forced marriages took place each year.

In June 2012, the British Government, under Prime Minister David Cameron, declared that forced marriage would become a criminal offence in the United Kingdom. In November 2013, it was reported that a case was brought before the High Court in Birmingham by local authority officials, involving a then-14-year-old girl who was taken to Pakistan, forced to marry a man ten years her senior, and, two weeks later, forced to consummate the marriage with threats, resulting in pregnancy; the court case ended with Mr. Justice Holman saying he was powerless to make a "declaration of non-recognition" of the forced marriage, since he was prevented by law from granting a declaration that her marriage was "at its inception, void". Mr. Justice Holman said that the girl, now 17, would have to initiate proceedings herself to have the marriage nullified. British courts can also issue civil orders to prevent forced marriage, and since 2014, refusing to obey such an order is grounds for a prison sentence of up to five years.

The Anti-Social Behaviour, Crime and Policing Act 2014 makes forcing someone to marry (including abroad) a criminal offence. The law came into effect in June 2014 in England and Wales, and in October 2014 in Scotland. In Northern Ireland, the Human Trafficking and Exploitation (Criminal Justice and Support for Victims) Act (Northern Ireland) 2015 criminalises forced marriage (section 16 – Offence of forced marriage).

In July 2014, the United Kingdom hosted its first global Girl Summit; the goal of the Summit was to increase efforts to end child marriage, early, and forced marriage, and female genital mutilation within a generation.

The first conviction for forced marriage in the United Kingdom occurred in June 2015, with the convicted being a man from Cardiff, who was subsequently sentenced to 16 years in prison.

Of the cases recorded by the government's Force Marriage Unit, run jointly between the Foreign and Commonwealth Office and the Home Office, the majority involved South Asia communities, with 37% linked to Pakistan, 11% linked to Bangladesh, and 7% linked to India. About 30% involved victims below the age of 18.

==== Sweden ====
In July 2014, forced marriages were criminalised to protect individuals who were forced to marry against their will (Swedish: äktenskapstvång). The maximum sentence is four years. No court has given the maximum sentence as of January 2019.

Schools in Skåne in the southern part of Sweden report that they discover that about 25 youth are forced to marry annually due to them being part of a shame society. An investigation by government organisation Ungdomsstyrelsen reported that 70,000 youth perceived they were unfree in their choice of spouse.

In July 2016, an Afghan man in Sweden was sentenced to 4 years in prison for forcing his daughter to marry someone in Afghanistan in the first Swedish conviction. He was also convicted for assault, threats, robbery, blackmailing, false imprisonment, and sexually molesting his daughter's Swedish boyfriend.

In January 2019, the maternal uncle and aunt of a 16-year-old girl of an Iraqi family were sentenced to 21 months in jail and had to pay €12500 in damages for forced marriage. In December 2016, her family discovered that the girl was dating a boy, and the family decided to marry her off to a cousin without her knowledge. Under the false pretense that her grandmother was mortally ill, the girl, her mother, aunt, and uncle travelled to Iraq where all but the girl had return tickets. In Iraq, the grandmother proved to be in good health, and the girl was to marry her cousin. Despite having no contacts in Iraq, and having her mobile phone taken from her, she managed to return to Sweden eight months later.

==== Other ====
Although forced marriage in Europe is predominately found within the immigrant population, it is also present among some local populations, especially among the Roma communities in Eastern Europe.

The British Forced marriage consultation, published in 2011, found forcing someone to marry to be a distinct criminal offence in Austria, Belgium, Turkey, Denmark, Norway, and Germany. In 2014, it became a distinct criminal offence in England and Wales.

The Council of Europe Convention on preventing and combating violence against women and domestic violence defines and criminalizes forced marriage, as well as other forms of violence against women. The Convention came into force on 1 August 2014.

In November 2014, UCL held an event, Forced Marriage: The Real Disgrace, where the award-winning documentary Honor Diaries was shown, and a panel, including Jasvinder Sanghera CBE (Founder of Karma Nirvana), Seema Malhotra MP (Labour Shadow Minister for Women), and Dr Reefat Drabu (former Assistant General Secretary of the Muslim Council of Britain), discussed the concept of izzat (honour), recent changes in British law, barriers to tackling forced marriage, and reasons to be hopeful of positive change.

=== The Americas ===
==== Canada ====
Forced marriage may be practised among some immigrant communities in Canada. Until recently, forced marriage has not received very much attention in Canada. The lack of attention has protected the practice from legal intervention. In 2015, Parliament enacted two new criminal offences to address the issue. Forcing a person to marry against their will is now a criminal offence under the Criminal Code, as is assisting or aiding a child marriage, where one of the participants is under age 16. There has also been the long-standing offence of solemnizing an illegal marriage, which was also modified by the 2015 legislation.

In addition to these criminal offences, the Civil Marriage Act stipulates: "Marriage requires the free and enlightened consent of two persons to be the spouse of each other", as well as setting 16 as the minimum age for marriage.

==== United States ====
According to Nancie L Katz, thousands of Pakistani girls have been flown out of the New York City area to Pakistan to undergo forced marriages; those who resist are threatened and coerced. The AHA Foundation commissioned a study by the John Jay College of Criminal Justice to research the incidence of forced marriage in New York City. The results of the study were equivocal, suggesting the presence of significant intergenerational tensions over marriage choices in migrant communities, but raising questions about the value of invidious culturally laden labels for such tensions However, AHA Foundation for the past 11 years has operated a helpline that successfully referred numerous individuals seeking help in fleeing or avoiding a forced marriage to qualified service providers and law enforcement. According to the National Center for Victims of Crime Conference, there are "limited laws/policies directly addressing forced marriage", although more general non-specific laws may be used. The organization Unchained at Last, an organization in the United States, assists women escaping forced or arranged marriages with free legal services and other resources. It was founded by Fraidy Reiss.

The Fundamentalist Church of Jesus Christ of Latter-Day Saints (FLDS) has been suspected of trafficking underage girls across state lines, as well as across the US–Canada and US–Mexico borders, for the purpose of sometimes involuntary plural marriage and sexual abuse. The FLDS is suspected by the Royal Canadian Mounted Police of having trafficked more than 30 under-age girls from Canada to the United States between the late 1990s and 2006 to be entered into polygamous marriages. RCMP spokesman Dan Moskaluk said of the FLDS's activities: "In essence, it's human trafficking in connection with illicit sexual activity." According to the Vancouver Sun, it is unclear whether or not Canada's anti-human trafficking statute can be effectively applied against the FLDS's pre-2005 activities, because the statute may not be able to be applied retroactively. An earlier three-year-long investigation by local authorities in British Columbia into allegations of sexual abuse, human trafficking, and forced marriages by the FLDS resulted in no charges, but did result in legislative change.

=== Oceania ===
==== Australia ====
In 2013, forced marriage laws were established in Australia; they have a maximum penalty of imprisonment for seven years.

In 2024, Sakina Muhammad Jan, a Hazara woman from Shepparton, became the first person to be jailed under Australia's forced marriage laws after ordering her 21-year-old daughter Ruqia Haidari to marry a man who later murdered her.

== Forced divorce ==
One internationally publicized and criticized instance of forced divorce occurred in Saudi Arabia in July 2005. Justice Ibrahim Al-Farraj of the first-instance court in Al-Jouf Province annulled in absentia the nearly three-year-old marriage of Mansour al-Timani and Fatima `Azzaz in response to a complaint from `Azzaz's half-brothers that her husband's tribe had insufficient social status compared to hers; the brothers also said that al-Timani had misrepresented his background. Her half-brothers filed the lawsuit with power of attorney obtained from Fatima's father, who was her male legal guardian while she was unmarried (and who later died). Al-Timani was not served the divorce papers until nine months later, in February 2006.

`Azzaz gave birth to their son in detention during the couple's forced separation. `Azzaz spent three months living with her mother and the couple's two children before sneaking off to Jeddah with Al-Timani, where they were arrested for living together as an unmarried couple. `Azzaz was detained in Dammam Public Prison with both their children and then another Dammam facility described as an orphanage with her son because she refused to return to her mother's family under her half-brothers' guardianship. She feared being married off to a "more suitable" man, As he was afraid they would be mistreated if sent to live with the brothers' family, Al-Timani later gained custody of their daughter, but was repeatedly detained and warned not to talk to the media. He said the first instance court had not asked the couple for its side of the story, that sharia law did not use tribal affiliation as a requirement for marriage, and that the brothers brought the case as part of an inheritance dispute. The Riyadh Court of Appeals (known as a Court of Cassation) upheld the annulment in January 2007. Authorities stopped letting the couple see each other after she gave an interview to Arab News in November 2006.

After King Salman asked the Supreme Court of Saudi Arabia, which did not exist at the time of the initial decision, to review the case, lawyers submitted arguments about al-Timani's tribal background. The Supreme Court ruled in January 2010 against the annulment, allowing the couple to reunite.

== Statistics ==
Child marriage (2008–2014):

Country	Married by 15	Married by 18	Source
Afghanistan	–	33%	Living Conditions Survey 2013-2013
Albania	0%	10%	DHS 2008–2009
Algeria	0%	3%	MICS 2012–2013
Armenia	0%	7%	DHS 2010
Azerbaijan	2%	11%	DHS 2011
Bangladesh	18%	52%	MICS 2012–2013
Barbados	1%	11%	MICS 2012
Belarus	0%	3%	MICS 2012
Belize	3%	26%	MICS 2011
Benin	11%	32%	DHS 2011–2012
Bhutan	6%	26%	MICS 2010
Bolivia	3%	22%	DHS 2008
Bosnia and Herzegovina	0%	4%	MICS 2011–2012
Brazil	11%	36%	PNDS 2006
Burkina Faso	10%	52%	DHS 2010
Burundi	3%	20%	DHS 2010
Cabo Verde	3%	18%	DHS 2005
Cambodia	2%	19%	DHS 2014
Cameroon	13%	38%	DHS 2011
Central African Republic	29%	68%	MICS 2010
Chad	29%	68%	MICS 2010
Colombia	6%	23%	DHS 2010
Comoros	10%	32%	DHS 2012
Congo	6%	33%	DHS 2011–2012
Costa Rica	7%	21%	MICS 2011
Côte d'Ivoire	10%	33%	DHS 2011–2012
Cuba	5%	26%	MICS 2014
Democratic Republic of the Congo	10%	37%	DHS 2013–2014
Djibouti	2%	5%	MICS 2006
Dominican Republic	10%	37%	DHS 2013
Ecuador	4%	22%	ENDEMAIN 2004
Egypt	2%	17%	DHS 2014
El Salvador	5%	25%	FESAL 2008
Equatorial Guinea	9%	30%	DHS 2011
Eritrea	13%	41%	Population and Health Survey 2010
Ethiopia	16%	41%	DHS 2011
Gabon	6%	22%	DHS 2012
Gambia	9%	30%	DHS 2013
Georgia	1%	14%	RHS 2010
Ghana	5%	21%	DHS 2014
Guatemala	7%	30%	ENSMI 2008/2009
Guinea	21%	52%	DHS 2012
Guinea-Bissau	7%	22%	MICS 2010
Guyana	6%	23%	DHS 2009
Haiti	3%	18%	DHS 2012
Honduras	8%	34%	DHS 2011–2012
India	18%	47%	NFHS 2005–2006
Indonesia	–	14%	National Socio-Economic Survey (SUSENAS) 2013
Iran	3%	17%	MIDHS 2010
Iraq	5%	24%	MICS 2011
Jamaica	1%	8%	MICS 2011
Jordan	0%	8%	DHS 2012
Kazakhstan	0%	6%	MICS 2010–2011
Kenya	4%	23%	DHS 2014
Kiribati	3%	20%	DHS 2009
Kyrgyzstan	1%	12%	MICS 2014
Lao People's Democratic Republic	9%	35%	MICS 2011–2012
Lebanon	1%	6%	MICS 2009
Lesotho	2%	19%	DHS 2009
Liberia	9%	36%	DHS 2013
Macedonia	1%	7%	MICS 2011
Madagascar	12%	41%	ENSOMD 2012–2013
Malawi	9%	46%	MICS 2013–2014
Maldives	0%	4%	DHS 2009
Mali	15%	55%	MICS 2010
Marshall Islands	6%	26%	DHS 2007
Mauritania	14%	34%	MICS 2011
Mexico	5%	23%	ENADID 2009
Mongolia	0%	5%	MICS 2010
Montenegro	1%	5%	MICS 2013
Morocco	3%	16%	DHS 2003–2004
Mozambique	14%	48%	DHS 2011
Namibia	2%	7%	DHS 2013
Nauru	2%	27%	DHS 2007
Nepal	10%	37%	MICS 2014
Nicaragua	10%	41%	ENDESA 2006
Niger	28%	76%	DHS 2012
Nigeria	17%	43%	DHS 2013
Pakistan	3%	21%	DHS 2012–2013
Panama	7%	26%	MICS 2013 KFR
Papua New Guinea	2%	21%	DHS 2006
Paraguay	–	18%	RHS 2004
Peru	3%	19%	Continuous DHS 2014
Philippines	2%	15%	DHS 2013
Qatar	0%	4%	MICS 2012
Republic of Moldova	0%	12%	MICS 2012
Rwanda	1%	8%	DHS 2010
Saint Lucia	1%	8%	MICS 2012
Samoa	1%	11%	DHS 2014
São Tomé and Príncipe	5%	34%	DHS 2008–2009
Senegal	9%	32%	Continuous DHS 2014
Serbia	0%	3%	MICS 2014
Sierra Leone	13%	39%	DHS 2013
Solomon Islands	3%	22%	DHS 2007
Somalia	8%	45%	MICS 2006
South Africa	1%	6%	DHS 2003
South Sudan	9%	52%	SHHS 2010
Sri Lanka	2%	12%	DHS 2006–2007
State of Palestine	1%	15%	MICS 2014
Sudan	7%	33%	SHHS 2010
Suriname	5%	19%	MICS 2010
Swaziland	1%	7%	MICS 2010
Syrian Arab Republic	3%	13%	MICS 2006
Tajikistan	0%	12%	DHS 2012
Thailand	4%	22%	MICS 2012
Timor-Leste	3%	19%	DHS 2009
Togo	6%	22%	DHS 2013–2014
Tonga	0%	6%	DHS 2012
Trinidad and Tobago	2%	8%	MICS 2006
Tunisia	0%	2%	MICS 2011–2012
Turkmenistan	1%	7%	MICS 2006
Tuvalu	0%	10%	DHS 2007
Uganda	10%	40%	DHS 2011
Ukraine	0%	9%	MICS 2012
United Republic of Tanzania	7%	37%	DHS 2010
Uruguay	1%	25%	MICS 2013
Uzbekistan	0%	7%	MICS 2006
Vanuatu	3%	21%	DHS 2013
Viet Nam	1%	11%	MICS 2014
Yemen	9%	32%	DHS 2013
Zambia	6%	31%	DHS 2013–2014
Zimbabwe	4%	34%	MICS 2014

Summary:

Region	Married by 15	Married by 18	Note
Sub-Saharan Africa	12%	39%	
Eastern and Southern Africa	10%	36%	
West and Central Africa	14%	42%	
Middle East and North Africa	3%	18%	
East Asia and Pacific	–	15%	Excluding China
Latin America and Caribbean	5%	23%	
CEE/CIS	1%	11%	
Least developed countries	13%	41%	

== See also ==
- Forced marriage of LGBTQ people
- Arranged marriage
- Knobstick wedding
- Forced conversion of minority girls in Pakistan
- Birth control sabotage
- Child marriage
- Forced pregnancy
- Marry-your-rapist law
- Shotgun wedding
- Bride kidnapping and Groom kidnapping
- Exchange of women
- Forced Marriage (Civil Protection) Act 2007 (UK legislation)
- Human trafficking
- Servile marriage
- Marriage of convenience
- United Nations 1956 Supplementary Convention on the Abolition of Slavery
- International Day for the Elimination of Child, Early and Forced Marriage
- Elopement

Activists and women famous for refusing forced marriage

- Nojoud Ali
- Franca Viola
