= LuminAID =

American lighting company

LuminAID is an emergency lighting company and the name of its key product, a solar-rechargeable light that packs flat and inflates to diffuse light like a lantern. LuminAID technology was invented in 2010 by Anna Stork and Andrea Sreshta. The company is based in Chicago.

== Product ==
The LuminAID light has a solar panel, rechargeable battery, and a multi-chip LED light. According to its makers, after a full charge, it can deliver 35 lumens for 8 hours or 20 lumens for 16 hours and the battery can be recharged over 500 times, for years of use.

The product has won first place in several business competitions, including the $100K Midwest 2013 Clean Energy Challenge, the William James Business Plan Competition, and the Chicago Booth School of Business Social New Venture Challenge. In 2016, LuminAID was granted a patent by the United States Patent Office for their lighting technology.

== History ==
LuminAID Lab is the manufacturer and producer of LuminAID lights. The company was founded in 2011 by Anna Stork and Andrea Sreshta, who invented the technology in 2010 in response to the 2010 Haiti earthquake while at Columbia Graduate School of Architecture, Planning and Preservation. They later experienced firsthand the damage caused by large-scale disasters while on a school trip during the March 2011 earthquake in Japan.

The inventors saw its potential as an outdoor recreation accessory in the US and began marketing it in that way. Its launch was linked to Indiegogo in an arrangement whereby purchasers could either buy two for $25, with one unit sent to a developing country, or buy a single unit for $10 to be donated.

As of July 2021, LuminAID's website has nine different solar lanterns for sale, along with a solar speaker.

=== Shark Tank appearance ===
Stork and Sreshta appeared on ABC's Shark Tank in February 2015 seeking a deal to fund their company. They received offers from all five of the "sharks," and accepted a deal with Mark Cuban for $200,000 for 15 percent of their company's equity.

Sreshta said that Cuban has helped her and Stork to stay innovative. LuminAID's solar lanterns now double as phone chargers, and the lanterns are being sold in retail stores for camping and outdoor use too.

=== Partnership with ShelterBox ===
After working together to distribute lights in the Philippines in 2013 after a typhoon, LuminAID and ShelterBox, an organization that provides disaster relief services, became strategic partners. Stork and Sreshta also traveled with Shelterbox to Malawi, where LuminAID lights were used following extreme flooding in 2015.

== See also ==
- Solight Design
- Solar lamp
- Solar-powered flashlight
