= Marriage age in the United States =

Marriageable age accounting for exceptions 18 17 16 15 0

General age of marriage without parental or court approval or other exceptions taken into account, with Mississippi in orange and Nebraska in green 18 19 21

In the United States, the minimum age at which a person can marry, with or without parental consent or other authorization, is set by each state and territory, either by statute or where the common law applies. The general marriage age (lacking authorization for an exception) is 18 years of age in all states except Nebraska, where the general marriage age is 19, and Mississippi, where the general marriage age is 21. The general marriage age is commonly the age of majority, though in Alabama the general marriage age is 18 while the age of majority is 19.

In recent years, the trend has been to adjust the general marriage age downward and to raise the age for women to that of men. Until 1971, approximately 80% of states had a general marriage age of 18 for women, while for men the general marriage age was 21 in approximately 85% of states.

When at least one of the marriage partners is under the general marriage age, the marriage is considered underage. Eighteen states completely ban underage marriage: Connecticut, Delaware, Massachusetts, Minnesota, New Jersey, New York, Pennsylvania, Vermont, Michigan, Rhode Island, Washington, Virginia, New Hampshire, Maine, Oregon, Missouri, Oklahoma, and California. The other states may require the underage partner to obtain either parental consent, judicial authorization, or both, or rely on "exceptional circumstances". The minimum underage marriage age, when all mitigating circumstances are taken into account, commonly ranges from 15 to 17. Five states do not allow a person over 21 to marry an underage person. As of January 2027, two US states do not set any minimum age for marriage.

In many states, a minor's marriage automatically emancipates the minor, or increases their legal rights beyond allowing the minor to consent to certain medical treatments.

== History ==
=== Colonial America ===
==== Marriage age ====
The minimum marriage age was 12 years for females and 14 years for males under English civil law until 1753. By default, these provisions became the minimum marriage ages in colonial America. The English Marriage Act 1753 required a marriage to be covered by a license (requiring parental consent for those under 21) or the publication of banns (which parents of those under 21 could forbid). Additionally, the Church of England dictated that both the bride and groom must be at least 21 years of age to marry without the consent of their families. English common law inherited from England remains in force in the United States unless and until a specific state enacted a law to replace or modify it.

==== Age of consent ====
In 1275, in England, as part of the rape law, the Statute of Westminster 1275, it was a misdemeanor to "ravish" a "maiden within age", whether with or without her consent. The phrase "within age" was interpreted by jurist Sir Edward Coke to mean the age of marriage, which at the time was 12 years. A 1576 law imposed more severe punishments for ravishing a girl for which the age of consent was set at 10 years. Jurist Sir Matthew Hale stated that both rape laws were valid at the same time. Under English common law the age of consent, as part of the law of rape, was 10 or 12 years and rape was defined as forceful sexual intercourse with a woman against her will. To convict a man of rape, both force and lack of consent had to be proven, except in the case of a girl who was under the age of consent. Since the age of consent applied in all circumstances, not just in physical assaults, the law also made it impossible for a girl under 12 years to consent to sexual activity. There was one exception: a man's acts with his wife (females over 12 years), to which rape law did not apply.

=== United States ===
==== Marriage age ====
English common law applied in each the United States jurisdiction unless and until a state statute replaced or modified it. In the United States, especially in recent years, the general marriage age has been revised downward so that they are now between 18 and 21 years of age.

There are three sets of marriage ages: 1) general marriage age, 2) the minimum marriage age set by statute and 3) minimum marriage age set by the common law. There are three sets of laws specifying minimum age requirements for marriage: 1) the minimum age with parental and judicial or court consent, 2) the minimum age with parental consent, and 3) the minimum age without parental consent.

There is little variation over time or across states in the laws without parental consent. Prior to 1971, approximately 80% of states specified an age of 18 for marriage without parental consent for women, and approximately 85% specified an age of 21 for men.

In states without a legislated minimum, common law (which specifies a minimum of 12 years old for females and 14 years old for males) prevails; the estimated effect of a common law is similar to a legislated minimum of 13 or less.

In California, the governing law is found in California Family Code sections 302 and 304 (2019): "An unmarried person under 18 years of age may be issued a marriage license upon obtaining a court order granting permission to the underage person or persons to marry, in accordance with the requirements described in Section 304." Historically, Section 56 of the California Civil Code (1872) fixed 15 as the age at which a female could marry without parental consent. In 1921, the age was raised to 18.

==== Age of consent ====
In Delaware, the age of consent was 10 years until 1871 when it was lowered to 7 years. Under the 1871 law, the penalty for sex with a girl below the age of consent was death.

In 1880, 37 states set the age of consent at 10 years, 10 states set an age of consent at 12 years, and Delaware had an age of consent of 7 years.

In California, early statutes forbade sexual intercourse with females under the age of 10, following the English statute of 1576. In 1889, the California statute was amended to raise the age to 14 years and the age was raised to 16 in 1897.

In the late-19th century, a "social purity movement" composed of Christian feminist reform groups began advocating a raise in the age of consent to 16, with the goal of raising it ultimately to 18. By 1920, 26 states had an age of consent of 16, 21 states had an age of consent of 18, and one state (Georgia) had an age of consent of 14.

Alaska became the 49th state in 1959, with the age of consent being 16 years. Hawaii became the 50th state in 1959, with the age of consent being 14 years.

Georgia raised its age of consent from 14 to 16 in 1995 as did Hawaii in 2001. Colorado lowered its age of consent to 15 in 1971, after it lowered the age of majority from 21 to 18 years.

As of August 1, 2018, the age of consent in each state in the United States was either 16 years, 17 years, or 18 years.

== Underage marriage ==
When at least one of the marriage partners is under the general marriage age, the marriage is considered underage and may require parental consent and/or judicial authorization. Also, adolescents can marry in "exceptional circumstances".

=== In the 50 states ===
The states allow an underage person to marry in the following circumstances:

If one or more of the following apply:

- consent of the parents or legal guardians of the minor
- consent of a court clerk or judge
- if the minor is emancipated.

Or in exceptional circumstances if one or more of the following circumstances apply:

- consent of a superior court judge, rather than a local judge, is required
- if one of the parties is pregnant
- if the minor has given birth to a child

In 5 states, a person who is 21 years old cannot marry a person under 18 years old: Arizona, Colorado, Idaho, Louisiana and Nevada. In one state, Florida, a person who is 20 cannot marry a person under 18 years old. In 3 states – Georgia, Tennessee and Ohio – a person who is 22 cannot marry a person under 18 years old. Indiana and Utah are nearly the same, although a person who is 21 can marry a person who is 17 years old.

Minimum age in 50 states:

- 2 states have no minimum age, but still require either parental consent, court approval or both: Mississippi and New Mexico.
- 2 states have a minimum age of 15: Hawaii and Kansas.
- 20 states have a minimum age of 16.
- 8 states have a minimum age of 17.
- 18 states have a minimum age of 18, which is the same as their general age: California, Connecticut, Delaware, Maine, Massachusetts, Michigan, Minnesota, Missouri, New Hampshire, New Jersey, New York, Oklahoma, Oregon, Pennsylvania, Rhode Island, Vermont, Virginia, and Washington.

Recently, several states have revisited the legality of child marriage. Since 2017, Connecticut, Texas, Florida, Kentucky, Arizona, Delaware, Tennessee, New Jersey, Missouri, Ohio and many more have changed their law to set or raise their minimum legal age for marriage.

In Massachusetts, the minimum marriage age is 18, but prior to July 29, 2022, adolescents could be married with judicial consent. Unlike many other states, in Massachusetts an adolescent's marriage did not automatically emancipate the minor, or increase his or her legal rights beyond allowing the minor to consent to certain medical treatments.

=== In the territories and federal district ===
Puerto Rico is a territory of the United States, and its people are American citizens. In Puerto Rico, the general marriage age is 21 as that is the age of majority. The general marriage age in Puerto Rico is 21 or 18 with parental consent. In Guam, the general age is 18, but 16-year-olds can get married with the consent of at least one parent or guardian. In American Samoa, since September 2018, the marriage age has been 18 for both sexes. Previously, the marriage age for females was 14. American Samoa does not allow underage marriages. In the District of Columbia minors can't marry. In the U.S. Virgin Islands, since January 2020, the marriage age has been 18 for both sexes. Prior to January 2020, the marriage age was 14 for females and 16 for males. In the Northern Mariana Islands, males must be 18 to marry, while females can marry at 16 with parental consent.

== List ==
=== States ===
Name	Marriage age		Age of consent	Notes
Name	General	Minimum	Age of consent	Notes
Alabama	18	16		With parental consent, a person can marry at 16.
Alaska	18	16	18	With both judicial and parental consent, a person can legally marry at 16 - provided that the older spouse is no more than 3 years apart - at the age of 16 or 17.
Arizona	18	16	18	A person can marry at 16, as long as one party isn't more than three years older than the minor, and 1) their parent consents, or 2) they are emancipated.
Arkansas	18	17	16	With parental consent, a person can marry at 17.
California	18			
Colorado	18	16	17	With parental consent and a court order based on "the best interest of the child," and no more than a three-year age gap, a child can marry at 16.
Connecticut	18		16	Minors cannot marry.
Delaware	18			Minors cannot marry.
Florida	18	17	18	With parental consent, a person can marry at 17 as long as one party isn't more than two years older than the minor.
Georgia	18	17	16	Emancipated minors who are 17 can marry after completing a premarital education course but not to someone more than four years older.
Hawaii	18	15	16	With parental consent, a person can marry at 16. A person who is 15 can marry with parental consent and judicial approval.
Idaho	18	16	18	With parental consent, a person can marry at 16 or 17, but only if there is no more than a three-year age gap between the two parties.
Illinois	18	16	17	With parental consent, a person can marry at 16.
Indiana	18	16		16- or 17-year-olds can marry someone no more than four years older with approval from a juvenile court judge.
Iowa	18	16		With parental consent and judicial approval, a person can marry at 16. If an underaged party doesn't have a parent or guardian or they're incompetent, the judge can offer approval instead. The judge can also override lack of parental consent if it's "unreasonably withheld".
Kansas	18	15	16	With parental consent, a person can marry at 16. With judicial approval, a person can marry at 15.
Kentucky	18	17	18	With judicial approval, a person can marry at 17.
Louisiana	18	16	17	With parental consent and judicial approval, a minor who is 16 or 17 can marry a person less than three years older. No person under 16 can marry.
Maine	18		16	Minors cannot marry.
Maryland	18	17	16	17-year-olds can only get married if they have the permission of each parent, guardian or legal custodian. If the 17-year-old does not get permission of a parent, guardian or legal custodian, they can petition the court to argue that they are self-sufficient and will be heard if they are entering a marriage under their own power.
Massachusetts	18		16	Minors cannot marry.
Michigan	18		16	Minors cannot marry.
Minnesota	18		16	Minors cannot marry.
Mississippi	21	—	16	With parental consent, males can marry at 17 and females at 15. Boys below 17 and girls below 15 can marry with judicial approval and parental consent.
Missouri	18		17	Minors cannot marry.
Montana	18	16		With parental consent and after at least two separate counseling sessions, a person can marry at 16.
Nebraska	19	17	16	With parental consent, a person can marry at 17.
Nevada	18	17	16	17 is the minimum age of marriage with 4 explicit requirements of - (1) parental or guardian consent; (2) proof of Nevada residence; (3) no more than a three-year age gap between both parties; and (4) a court order within the state.
New Hampshire	18		16	Minors cannot marry.
New Jersey	18		16	Minors cannot marry.
New Mexico	18	—	16	With parental consent, a person can marry at 16. A 16 or 17 year old teen can marry with the written consent of each living parent of the minor. A person under 16 can marry with judicial approval and parental consent or if pregnant, or by order of a children's or family division of district court.
New York	18		17	Minors cannot marry.
North Carolina	18	16		North Carolina's marriage laws signed and implemented since August 2021, requires that - (1) 16 and 17 year olds to receive parental permission or a judge's approval and also (2) the age difference between the parties can not be four years or more difference.
North Dakota	18	16	18	With parental consent, a person can marry at 16.
Ohio	18	17	16	In 2019, the minimum age was set at 17, with judicial consent, in cases where the age difference is less than four years.
Oklahoma	18			Minors cannot marry.
Oregon	18			Minors cannot marry.
Pennsylvania	18		16	Minors cannot marry.
Rhode Island	18		16	Minors cannot marry.
South Carolina	18	16		With parental consent, a person can marry at 16.
South Dakota	18	16		With parental consent, a person can marry at 16.
Tennessee	18	17	18	With parental consent, a person can marry at 17; however, one party cannot be more than four years older than the minor.
Texas	18	16	17	Emancipated minors who are 16 or 17 years old can marry.
Utah	18	16	18	With parental consent and judicial approval, a person can marry at 16.
Vermont	18		16	Minors cannot marry.
Virginia	18			Minors cannot marry.
Washington	18		16	Minors cannot marry.
West Virginia	18	16		With parental consent, minors aged 16 and 17 are permitted to marry, as long as the spouse is not more than four years older.
Wisconsin	18	16	18	With parental consent, a person can marry at age 16.
Wyoming	18	16	17	With both parental or guardian and judicial consent conditions, a person can marry at either 16 or 17. If two 16- or 17-year-olds wish to marry and are both legally emancipated and/or homeless, they can marry without consent and authorization.

=== District of Columbia and United States Territories ===
Name	Marriage age		Age of consent	Notes
Name	General	Minimum		Notes
American Samoa	18		16	Minors cannot marry.
District of Columbia	18		16	Minors cannot marry.
Guam	18	16	16	The consent of at least one parent or guardian is required for a person aged 16 or 17 to get married.
Northern Mariana Islands	18	16	16	Males at the time of marriage must be at least 18 years of age, while females aged 16–17 can marry with the consent of at least one parent or guardian. A child of any age can marry if both are citizens of the Trust Territory. However, the Trust Territory of the Pacific Islands was dissolved in 1994; therefore, the conditions described in the preceding sentence are moot.
Puerto Rico	21	18	16	Anyone from the ages of 18 to 21 can marry with the consent of both parents (if applicable) or guardian.
U.S. Virgin Islands	18			Minors cannot marry.

== See also ==
- Age of majority
- Ages of consent in the United States
- Child marriage in the United States
- Full Faith and Credit Clause
- Marriageable age
- Minor (law)
- Teenage marriage
