= Fraidy Reiss =

American activist

Fraidy Reiss is a United States–based activist against forced marriage, child marriage, and teenage marriage.

== Life ==
Reiss was raised Haredi Jewish in Brooklyn, New York. At age 19, she entered an arranged marriage to a man she had known for three months. She married the man, and had two children with him.

According to Reiss, in the first week of her marriage, her then-husband began to abuse her, repeatedly threatening to kill her and engaging in other forms of violence. Reiss says she only realized that she was experiencing domestic violence when she spoke with a therapist outside of her community. Nonetheless, her family encouraged her to stay with her husband. After one violent episode, Reiss applied for a temporary restraining order, the first woman in her community to do so. However, she says her rabbi sent an attorney, also a member of the Haredi community, to take Reiss to family court, to tell the judge that she wished to drop the order. Reiss developed a five-year escape plan, and was eventually able to go to college, get a job, support her family, and divorce her husband.

Reiss graduated at 32 from Rutgers University, and was commencement speaker. She began work as a journalist. Reiss left her husband after twelve years of marriage, and was shunned by her family after doing so. She finally was able to obtain a divorce three years after leaving him. Reiss subsequently left Judaism, and became an atheist. Reiss has not spoken to her family since then, save for her sister on occasion.

In 2016, it was announced that Reiss would become the subject of a documentary by production company Women Rising. Sara Hirsh Bordo will direct the documentary, and production on it was scheduled to begin in fall of 2016.

== Activism ==
In 2011, Reiss founded the non-profit organization Unchained At Last, to support people who wish to leave arranged and forced marriages. The organization is incorporated in New Jersey. Unchained At Last serves people from various communities. The organization tailors services to each client's background. Unchained At Last offers legal assistance and other direct services for the survivors. The organization also helps clients with social services, so that they can continue with their lives, as well as mentoring. Reiss has also participated in a planning session held by the White House Council on Women and Girls that would target development of a national policy on forced and child marriages. Reiss also collaborated with New Jersey senator Loretta Weinberg on a draft of a law that would allow women to access crime victimization records free of charge. This would allow the women to use those records as proof to obtain restraining orders. As of 2024, the organization has assisted over 1,000 survivors.

Upon learning about the phenomenon of marriage under the age of 18 in the United States, Reiss took on ending marriage under the age of 18 in all 50 U.S. states. In 2018, the first two U.S. states – Delaware and New Jersey – signed laws ending all marriage before 18. Also in 2018, American Samoa, a U.S. territory, ended child marriage. Pennsylvania, Minnesota, and the U.S. Virgin Islands followed in 2020, then Rhode Island and New York in 2021, and Massachusetts in 2022. In 2023, Vermont, Connecticut, and Michigan ended child marriage. Washington, Virginia and New Hampshire followed in 2024. In 2025, Washington, D.C., a U.S. district and the nation's capital, also passed legislation to set the marriage age at 18, as did Maine, Oregon and Missouri, bringing to 16 the total number of states that have ended child marriage. In 2026, child marriage became illegal in Oklahoma. California also outlawed child marriage in 2026 with the passing of a bill cosponsored by Unchained at Last and the California Commission on the Status of Women and Girls.

== Media ==
Reiss has written several op-eds for outlets like The Washington Post, The Star-Ledger, CNN, The Hill, and Refinery29 (co-authored by Chelsea Clinton). In 2017, Forbes named Reiss one of five women who are tackling some of the world's "most urgent issues". Reiss was featured in Great Big Story's "Defenders" series about fearless, headstrong, undeterred women fighting for change in the spirit of Ruth Bader Ginsburg, and was one of the titular "gutsy women" featured in Hillary and Chelsea Clinton's 2019 book, The Book of Gutsy Women and subsequent Apple TV+ docuseries, Gutsy.

Reiss lent her expertise to the A&E documentary, I Was a Child Bride: The Untold Story, with Elizabeth Vargas, in 2019.

== See also ==
- Child marriage in the United States
- Forced marriage
