= Alice Min Soo Chun =

American businesswoman (born 1975)

- Born: 1975 (age 50–51); South Korea
- Occupation: CEO

Alice Min Soo Chun (born 1975) is the founder and CEO of Solight Design and the inventor of the SolarPuff.

== Early life ==
Born in South Korea in 1975, to an architect father and painter mother. Chun and her parents moved to the United States in 1978, settling in Syracuse, New York.

As a teen Chun and her parents moved back to South Korea. Chun later returned to the US attend the University of Pennsylvania.

== Work ==
Chun became a professor of architectural design and material technology at Columbia University and Parsons School of Design. Chun focused her work on solar energy and ways to bring solar energy into everyday living, beginning to prototype an inflatable solar light in 2008. In 2010, following the Haiti earthquake, Chun challenged her class of design students to create a solar light solution that could be used immediately in disaster relief situations.

In 2011, Chun designed the SolarPuff, based on origami techniques to create a cube that inflates on it own, without the requirement to be inflated by mouth, which can pass on germs. By 2015, she launched a company Solar Design and crowdfunded the SolarPuff, raising nearly half a million dollars. At this time Chun stopped teaching to focus full-time on being a social entrepreneur.

As of 2019, the solar puff is available in twenty countries and sold commercially in the United States, with 10% of profits going to Chun's charity Studio Unite, benefiting refugees and people living in the developing world. The solar light has been extremely useful in reducing crime in refugee camps, with a 20% reduction in rape and sexual assault in Syrian camps.

In 2020, in response to COVID-19 and the waste seen in using non-recyclable surgical masks Chun and her team of designers produced the Seeus95 mask. The reusable mask is adhesive and made from clear silicone. As of January 2020, the kickstarter has raised over $380,000.
