= International Day for the Elimination of Child, Early and Forced Marriage =

United Nations observance on 27 November

- Type: International
- Significance: Raise awareness and accelerate action to end child, early and forced marriage
- Date: 27 November
- Frequency: Annual
- First time: 2026
- Related to: Child marriage, Forced marriage, Sustainable Development Goal 5

The International Day for the Elimination of Child, Early and Forced Marriage is a United Nations international observance held annually on 27 November. The United Nations General Assembly established the day in September 2026 to promote awareness and advocacy, support victims and survivors, encourage accountability, and strengthen efforts to eliminate child, early and forced marriage.

== Background ==
The United Nations describes child, early and forced marriage as a harmful practice that violates, abuses or impairs human rights. It disproportionately affects women and girls, particularly those in vulnerable situations, and can threaten education, health, economic opportunities and the full enjoyment of human rights. The practice is addressed by Sustainable Development Goal 5, whose target 5.3 calls for the elimination of harmful practices, including child, early and forced marriage, by 2030.

The General Assembly had previously adopted resolutions addressing child, early and forced marriage. In the 2026 resolution establishing the observance, it noted that no United Nations international day had previously been designated specifically for the issue. The resolution also recognises that in some regions and contexts the practice includes informal unions that are not formalised, registered or recognised by religious, customary or state authorities.

== Adoption of the resolution ==
On 4 September 2026, during its eightieth session, the General Assembly adopted resolution A/RES/80/309, titled International Day for the Elimination of Child, Early and Forced Marriage, without a vote. The resolution followed draft A/80/L.99, submitted by Cabo Verde, Costa Rica, Morocco and Sierra Leone. Contemporary reporting described Sierra Leone as leading the initiative and reported that at least 66 other countries, including India, co-sponsored the resolution.

The campaign for a dedicated international observance was promoted by Sierra Leone's First Lady Fatima Maada Bio and Bhuwan Ribhu, founder of the child-rights organisation Just Rights for Children. Inter Press Service reported that Ribhu called for the establishment of an international day during the Commission on the Status of Women in March 2026.

The resolution invites Member States, United Nations entities, international and regional organisations, religious leaders, civil society, academic institutions, the private sector and other stakeholders to observe the day through education, public-awareness and advocacy activities. It identifies the aims of preventing child, early and forced marriage, supporting victims and survivors, and promoting accountability. It also encourages countries to develop and implement comprehensive, multisectoral national strategies and action plans, and to share information and good practices concerning measures to prevent and eliminate the practice.

The resolution calls on Member States to invest in quality education for girls, including programmes that enable married girls and young women to continue or return to education, and to promote the empowerment of women and girls as a prevention strategy. It states that costs arising from activities to implement the resolution are to be met through voluntary contributions, subject to their availability.

== Significance of the date ==
The date coincides with the launch anniversary of India's Bal Vivah Mukt Bharat (Child Marriage Free India) campaign, which the Government of India launched on 27 November 2024. The campaign aims to eliminate child marriage in India by 2030.

Inter Press Service reported that Ribhu recommended 27 November partly because of large-scale public pledges against child marriage made in India in 2024; the scale of that mobilisation was described by Ribhu.

== Observance ==
The first observance is scheduled for 27 November 2026. The General Assembly encourages governments and other stakeholders to use the day for public education and awareness, advocacy, support for victims and survivors, and the sharing of effective practices. It also links the observance to efforts to meet the 2030 target under Sustainable Development Goal 5.3.

== See also ==
- Child marriage
- Forced marriage
- Sustainable Development Goal 5
- United Nations General Assembly
- International Day of the Girl Child
