= Sherry Johnson =

American activist

- Born: 1959 or 1960 (age 66–67); Tampa, Florida, U.S.
- Occupation: Human rights activist
- Years active: 2004–present
- Known for: Activist against child marriage in the United States.

Sherry Yvonne Johnson (born 1959 or 1960) is an American activist who advocates for restrictions on child marriage in the United States.

Johnson successfully campaigned for tighter restrictions on child marriage in her home state of Florida. Prior to 2018, pregnant children of any age in Florida could get married with a judge's permission. With the passage of the 2018 legislation, children under 17 are prohibited from getting married.

== Early life and first marriage ==
Johnson grew up in Tampa, Florida. She was an only child, and her household consisted of her, her mother, and her mother's husband. They lived in the parsonage of their conservative Pentecostal church. Beginning at age 9, Johnson was repeatedly raped by the deacon and bishop of her church. Johnson was also raped by her mother's husband.

She became pregnant as a result of rape at age 10. The pregnancy was not recognized until she was 7 months along in gestation. Johnson's mother did not support or believe her statements that she was raped and did not accompany her to the hospital when it was time to deliver the baby. Johnson's mother arranged for her to marry the deacon who had raped her, Alfonsa Tolbert, age 20, so that he under marry-your-rapist laws could avoid criminal charges.

At the time, 16- and 17-year-old minors could get married with parental permission in Florida, and children of any age could be married with the permission of a county judge if a pregnancy was involved. While the first judge refused to license the marriage of a child so young—though it was legal—a second judge agreed to grant the license and Johnson was married to Tolbert on March 29, 1971, at age 11. Johnson had six children by the time she was 17 years old and dropped out of school after ninth grade to raise them. At age 17, she sought help from the Legal Aid Society, which gave her $75 to cover the filing fee for her divorce.

== After first divorce ==
At age 19, Johnson remarried a man 18 years her senior. Together, they had three children. They were married for 26 years before separating in 2002.

== Activism ==
Johnson published a book detailing her experience as a child bride, Forgiving the Unforgivable. She is opposed to child marriage on the basis that children cannot enter into other legal contracts. Johnson stated, "You can't get a job, you can't get a car, you can't get a license, you can't sign a lease, so why allow someone to marry when they're still so young?" Johnson also believes that permitting child marriage allows rapists to escape the legal consequences of their crimes by marrying their victims. Speaking on how she was forced to marry the man who raped her, Johnson said, "No one actually protected me. They protected him by putting the handcuffs on me, instead of putting the handcuffs on him, and he was the rapist."

In 2012, Johnson began to lobby the Florida state legislature to make child marriage illegal. Johnson initially faced opposition or disbelief from lawmakers, with some lawmakers incorrectly asserting to her that child marriage such as hers was not legal in Florida, or that her case was anomalous. However, Johnson's ideas gained traction with lawmakers over time. After the Florida Senate voted unanimously to ban child marriage, Senator Lizbeth Benacquisto called Johnson "the reason for the bill". The proposed ban on child marriage was amended, however, to allow 17-year-olds to marry. 17-year-olds can marry in the state of Florida, regardless of if a pregnancy is involved, as long as their intended partner is less than two years older than they are. Such couples would also have to take a premarital preparation course, as well as sign an affidavit that the marriage is not coerced. If a pregnancy is involved, the couple must receive additional counseling. This amended legislation again passed unanimously in the Senate; in the House, support was near-unanimous, with George Moraitis the lone dissenter. Moraitis stated, "I'm particularly focused on the pregnancy aspect of it. I don't want the message to be that it's better to not get married." On March 23, 2018, this legislation (Senate Bill 140) was signed by Governor Rick Scott.

Despite the lack of an outright ban on child marriage in Florida, Johnson stated that she was pleased with the bill, saying, "I can deal with the line of [age] 17 with all of the requirements." While she was happy with the legislative victory in Florida, Johnson indicated that her activism against child marriage was not over. She stated, "My mission is for the world, for the children all over the world," she said. "It's not just Florida . . . It's for the children everywhere."
