= List of child bridegrooms =

This article contains a list of child bridegrooms or child husbands wherein notable or historically significant examples have been singled out.

== List ==
=== Antiquity ===
- Tutankhamun was married before the age of nine years to his half-sister Ankhesenamun (aged about 16).

=== 8th century ===
- The future Emperor Shōmu (aged about 16) was married to in Asukabe-hime (aged 16) c. 717.

=== 10th century ===
- The future Otto II, Holy Roman Emperor (aged 16/17), was married to Theophanu (aged about 17) in 972.
- The future Louis V of France (aged about 15) was married to the twice-widowed Adelaide-Blanche of Anjou (aged 40) in 982.
- The future Emperor Ichijō (aged 10) was married to Fujiwara no Teishi (about 12/13) in October 990.

=== 11th century ===
- The future Emperor Go-Ichijō (aged 10) married his aunt Fujiwara no Ishi (aged 19) in 1018.
- The future Emperor Horikawa (aged 14) was married to his paternal aunt Princess Tokushi (aged about 33) in 1093.

=== 12th century ===
- Pons, Count of Tripoli (aged 13/14), was married to Cecile of France (aged 14/15) in 1112.
- William Adelin (aged 15), son and heir of Henry I of England, was married to Matilda of Anjou (aged about 8) in 1119.
- Louis VII of France (aged 17) married Eleanor of Aquitaine (aged about 15) in 1137; their marriage was annulled in 1152.
- Eustace IV, Count of Boulogne (aged about 12/13), was married to Constance of France (aged about 15/16) in 1140.
- Philip I, Count of Flanders (aged 15/16), was married to Elisabeth of Vermandois (aged 16) in 1159.
- The future Emperor Nijō (aged 15) was married to his paternal aunt Princess Yoshiko (aged 17) in March 1159.
- Alfonso VIII of Castile (aged 14/15) married Eleanor of England in 1170, when she was about 9-years-old.
- Henry the Young King (aged 17) was married to Margaret of France (aged 13/14) in 1172. They had been betrothed since 1160, when Henry was 5 and Margaret was about 2.
- Canute VI of Denmark (aged about 13/14) was married to Gertrude of Bavaria (aged 22 or 25) in 1177. They had been engaged since 1171, since he was about 7/8 and she was about 16 or 19.
- Henry I of Brabant (aged about 14), was married to Matilda of Boulogne (aged 9) in 1179.
- Alexios II Komnenos was 10 when he is reported to have married Agnes of France (aged 9) in 1180.
- Philip II of France (aged 14) married Isabella of Hainault (aged 10) in 1180.
- Humphrey IV of Toron (aged about 17) married Isabella I of Jerusalem (aged 10/11) in 1183. They had been betrothed when Humphrey was about 14/15 and Isabella was 8-years-old.
- Conrad II, Duke of Swabia (aged 13/14), married Berengaria of Castile in 1187, when she was about 8-years-old. The marriage was never consummated due to Berengaria's young age.
- William IV of Ponthieu (aged 15/16), was married to Alys of France, Countess of Vexin (aged 34), in 1195.

=== 13th century ===
- Frederick, King of Sicily (aged 14) was married to Constance of Aragon (aged 30) in 1209.
- Henry VI, Count Palatine of the Rhine (aged about 16), was married to Matilda of Brabant (aged about 12) in 1212.
- Henry I of Castile married his cousin Mafalda of Portugal (aged about 20) in 1215, when he was either 10- or 11-years-old. The marriage was never consummated due to Henry's young age; and the marriage was annulled by the Pope in 1216 on the grounds of consanguinity. Later that year, Henry was betrothed to his second cousin Sancha, heiress of León, but he died in 1217 at the age of 13.
- Baldwin II of Constantinople (aged about 17) was married to Marie of Brienne (aged about 10) in 1234.
- Alexander III of Scotland (aged 10) was married to Margaret of England (aged 11) in December 1251.
- Edward I of England (aged 15) was married to Eleanor of Castile (aged 13) in 1254.
- The future Philip III of France (aged 17) was married to Isabella of Aragon (aged 13/14) in May 1262. They had been betrothed since May 1258, when he was 13 and she was 9/10.
- John I of Brabant (17/18), was married to Margaret of France (aged 15/16) in 1270.
- The future Ladislaus IV of Hungary (aged 7/8) was married to Elizabeth of Sicily (aged 8/9) in 1270.
- Philip of Sicily (aged about 15/16) was married to Isabella of Villehardouin (aged either 8 or 11) in May 1271.
- The future Philip IV of France (aged 16) was married to Joan I of Navarre (aged 11) in August 1285.
- Wenceslaus II of Bohemia (aged 13) was married to Judith of Habsburg (aged 13) in January 1285.
- John II of Brabant (aged 14), was married to Margaret of England (aged 15) in 1290. John and Margaret had been betrothed since they were 2 and 3, respectively.
- Henry, Count of Luxembourg (aged about 13/14), was married to Margaret of Brabant (aged 15) in July 1292.
- John I, Count of Holland (aged 12/13), was married to Elizabeth of Rhuddlan (aged 14) in 1297.

=== 14th century ===
- Roger Mortimer, 1st Earl of March (aged 14), was married to Joan de Geneville (aged 15) in 1301.
- The future Gaston I of Foix (aged 13/14), was married to Joan of Artois (aged 11/12) in 1301.
- The future Louis X of France (aged 15) was married to Margaret of Burgundy (aged about 15) in 1305.
- The future Philip V of France (aged about 13/14) was married to Joan of Burgundy (aged 14/15) in 1307.
- The future Charles IV of France (aged 13) was married to Blanche of Burgundy (aged about 11/12) in January 1308.
- John of Luxembourg (aged 14) was married to Elizabeth of Bohemia (aged 18) in September 1310.
- John III, Duke of Brabant (aged 10/11), was married to Marie of Évreux (aged 7/8) in 1311.
- Edmund Mortimer (aged about 13/14, possibly younger) was married to Elizabeth de Badlesmere (aged 3) in 1316.
- Thomas Beauchamp (aged about 6) was married to Katherine Mortimer (aged about 5) in 1319.
- Louis I, Count of Flanders (aged about 15/16), was married to Margaret of France (aged 9/10) in 1320.
- Guigues VIII of Viennois (aged 13/14) was married to Isabella of France (aged 10/11) in 1323.
- Alfonso XI of Castile (aged 13/14) was married to Constanza Manuel of Villena (aged at most 10) in 1325. He had the marriage annulled two years later, and in 1328, at the age of 16/17, married his double first cousin Maria of Portugal (aged 14/15).
- Edward III of England (aged 15) was married to Philippa of Hainault (between the ages of 12 and 17) in 1327.
- The future David II of Scotland (aged 4) was married to Joan of the Tower (aged 7) in 1328.
- Laurence Hastings, 1st Earl of Pembroke (aged about 9/10), was married to Agnes Mortimer (aged about 11/12) in 1328 or 1329. Laurence was a ward of Agnes's father, Roger Mortimer, 1st Earl of March.
- Charles IV, King of Bohemia (aged about 12/13; later Holy Roman Emperor), was married to Blanche of Valois (aged about 12/13) in 1329.
- Reginald II, Duke of Guelders (aged about 16), was married to Sophia Berthout in 1311. After Sophia's death in 1329, he married Eleanor of Woodstock (aged 13) in 1332, when he was about 37-years-old.
- John, Duke of Normandy (aged 13), was married to Bonne of Luxembourg (aged 17) in July 1332.
- Andrew of Hungary (aged 6) was married to the future Joanna I of Naples (aged about 6/7) in 1333.
- William IV, Count of Holland (aged 10/11), was married to Joanna of Brabant (aged 11/12) in 1334.
- Marie de Namur (aged about 13/14) was married to Henry II, Graf of Vianden, in 1335/36. Henry was murdered in 1337; about three years later, in 1340, Marie (now about 17/18) was married to Theobald of Bar, Seigneur de Pierrepont (aged about 25/26), her second cousin, once removed.
- Philip of Burgundy (aged about 14/15) was married to Joan I, Countess of Auvergne (aged about 11/12), circa 1338.
- William Montagu (aged 12) was married to Joan of Kent (aged 13) in either late 1340 or early 1341. In 1348, it was revealed that Joan had secretly married Thomas Holland, 1st Earl of Kent, in 1340; and, as a result, Montagu's marriage to Joan was annulled.
- Gaston III of Foix (aged 16/17), was married to Agnes of Navarre (aged 13/14) in 1348.
- Charles V of France (aged 12) was married Joanna of Bourbon (aged 12) to in April 1350.
- Thomas de Vere, 8th Earl of Oxford (aged about 15), was married to Maud de Ufford (born 1345/46) sometime before 10 June 1350, when Maud was about 5-years-old.
- Lionel of Antwerp, Duke of Clarence (aged 13/14), was married to Elizabeth de Burgh, 4th Countess of Ulster (aged 20), in 1352.
- Philip I, Duke of Burgundy (aged 10/11), was married to the future Countess Margaret III of Flanders (aged 6/7), in 1357.
- Richard Fitzalan (aged 12/13) was married to Elizabeth de Bohun (aged about 9) in 1359.
- John Hastings, 2nd Earl of Pembroke (aged 11), was married to Margaret of England (aged 12), daughter of Henry III of England, in 1359.
- Gian Galeazzo Visconti (aged 8) was married to Isabella of Valois (aged 11/12) in October 1360, about a week before Gian's 9th birthday.
- Albert III, Duke of Austria (aged 16/17), was married to Elisabeth of Bohemia (aged 7/8) in 1366.
- Edmund Mortimer, 3rd Earl of March (aged 15/16), was married to Philippa of Clarence (aged 12/13) in 1368.
- The future Charles III of Navarre (aged 13/14) was married to Eleanor of Castile (aged about 12) in May 1375.
- John V, Lord of Arkel (aged 14), was married to Joanna of Jülich in October 1376.
- John Hastings, 3rd Earl of Pembroke (aged 8), was married to Elizabeth of Lancaster (aged 17) in 1380. The marriage remained unconsummated due to John's age, and was annulled after Elizabeth became pregnant by John Holland, 1st Duke of Exeter, whom she later married.
- Henry Bolingbroke (aged 13; later King Henry IV of England) was married to Mary de Bohun (aged about 10/11) in 1380.
- Richard II of England (aged 15) was married to Anne of Bohemia (aged 15) in January 1382.
- John, Count of Nevers (aged 14) was married to Margaret of Bavaria (aged 21/22) in April 1385.
- The future Duke John V of Brittany (aged 6/7), was married to Joan of France (aged 4/5) in 1396.
- John of Perche (aged 10/11) was married to Marie of Brittany (aged 5) in July 1396.

=== 15th century ===
- Louis, Duke of Guyenne (aged 7), married Margaret of Nevers (aged 10) in August 1404.
- Charles, Duke of Orléans (aged 11), married his cousin Isabella of Valois (aged 16) in June 1406.
- Philip the Good (aged 12) was married to Michelle of Valois (aged 14) in June 1409.
- John, Duke of Touraine (aged 16), was married to Jacqueline of Hainaut (aged 14) in 1415.
- John IV, Duke of Brabant (aged 14), was married to Jacqueline of Hainaut (aged 16) in March 1418, following her first husband's death the year before.
- John II, Duke of Alençon (aged 15), married Joan of Valois (aged 15), daughter of Charles, Duke of Orléans, in 1424.
- Louis, Dauphin of France (aged 12), was married to Margaret Stewart (aged 11), daughter of James I of Scotland, in June 1436. The wedding took place a little over a week before Louis's thirteenth birthday.
- Henry IV of Castile (aged 14/15) was married to his cousin Blanche of Navarre (aged 15/16) in 1440.
- Afonso V of Portugal (aged 15) was married to Isabel of Coimbra (aged 15) in May 1447.
- John de la Pole (age 7) was married to Lady Margaret Beaufort, (age 7; approximately) in 1450 by the arrangement John's father. The marriage was annulled in 1453.
- Ferdinand II of Aragon (aged 17) was married to his second cousin Infanta Isabella of Castile (aged 18; later Isabella I of Castile) in 1469. They became the parents of Catherine of Aragon.
- John, Prince of Portugal (aged 14) was married to his first cousin Eleanor of Viseu (aged 11) in January 1470.
- Louis, Duke of Orléans (aged 14) was married to his cousin Joan of France, Duchess of Berry (age 12), in 1476.
- Richard of Shrewsbury, Duke of York (age 4), was married to Anne de Mowbray, 8th Countess of Norfolk (age 6), in 1477. She died at age 10 and he, as one of the Princes in the Tower, is believed to have been murdered at age 10.
- Afonso, Hereditary Prince of Portugal (aged about 15), was married by proxy to Isabella of Aragon (aged 19) in the spring of 1490.

=== 16th century ===
- Arthur, Prince of Wales (aged 15), was married to Catherine of Aragon (aged 15) in 1501. He died a few months later and she eventually married his younger brother, the future Henry VIII.
- Ismail I of Persia (aged 16/17), was married to Tajlu Khanum (aged 19), in 1504.
- Charles, Count of Montpensier (aged 15), was married to Suzanne, Duchess of Bourbon (aged 14), in 1505.
- Henry VIII of England (aged 17), married Catherine of Aragon (aged 23) in June 1509, a couple of weeks before his 18th birthday.
- Claude, Duke of Guise (aged 16), was married to Antoinette de Bourbon (aged 18) in 1513.
- Henry, Duke of Orléans (aged 14), was married to Catherine de' Medici (aged 14) in 1533.
- Henry Grey, Marquess of Dorset (aged 15/16), was married to Lady Frances Brandon (aged 15/16) in 1533.
- Henry Clifford (aged 17/18) was married to Lady Eleanor Brandon (aged 15/16) in 1535.
- Ottavio Farnese, Duke of Parma (aged 14), grandson of Pope Paul III, was married to Margaret of Parma (aged 15), illegitimate daughter of Charles V, Holy Roman Emperor, in November 1538.
- Philip, Prince of Asturias (aged 16; later Philip II of Spain), was married to Maria Manuela, Princess of Portugal (aged 16), in 1543.
- João Manuel, Prince of Portugal (aged 14), was married to his double first cousin Joanna of Austria (aged 16) in 1552.
- Lord Guildford Dudley (aged about 17/18) was married to Lady Jane Grey (aged about 16/17) in 1553.
- Henry, Lord Herbert, who was at most 15-years-old, was married to Lady Katherine Grey (aged 12), younger sister of Lady Jane Grey, in 1553. The marriage was annulled in 1554.
- Francis, Dauphin of France (aged 13/14), was married to Mary, Queen of Scots (aged 15/16), in 1558. The pair had been betrothed since Mary was five and Francis was three.
- Charles III, Duke of Lorraine (aged 15), was married to Claude of Valois (aged 11), daughter of Henry II of France, in 1559.

=== 17th century ===
- Tamahime (aged 3) was married to Maeda Toshitsune (aged 7) in 1601.
- Senhime (aged 7) was married to Toyotomi Hideyori (aged 10) in 1603.
- Alfonso, Hereditary Prince of Modena (aged 16/17), was married to Isabella of Savoy (aged 16) in 1608.
- César, Duke of Vendôme (aged 14), was married to Françoise de Lorraine (aged 15/16) in July 1608.
- Frederick V of the Palatinate (aged 16), married Elizabeth Stuart (aged 16), eldest daughter of James VI and I and Anne of Denmark, in 1613.
- Louis XIII of France (aged 14) was married to his second cousin Anne of Austria (aged 14) in November 1615.
- The future Ferdinand Maria, Elector of Bavaria (aged 14), was married to Princess Henriette Adelaide of Savoy (aged 14) in December 1650.
- The future William II, Prince of Orange (aged 15), married Mary, Princess Royal (aged 9), in 1641. The marriage was reported to not have been consummated for a number of years due to the bride's age.
- Walter Scott of Highchester (aged 14) was married to Mary Scott, 3rd Countess of Buccleuch (aged 11), in 1659.
- James Crofts, 1st Duke of Monmouth (aged 14), illegitimate son of Charles II of England and his mistress Lucy Walter, was married to Anne Scott, 1st Duchess of Buccleuch (aged 12), in April 1663.
- John Power (aged 7/8) was married to his cousin Katherine FitzGerald, Viscountess Grandison (aged 12) in May 1673. The marriage was arranged by John's father Richard, and it was annulled in 1677. Katherine then went on to marry Edward Villiers that same year.
- Sir Edward Lee (aged 14) was married to Lady Charlotte FitzRoy (aged 13) in 1677. They had been betrothed since 1674, before Charlotte's tenth birthday.
- Ivan V of Russia (aged 17) was married to Praskovia Saltykova (aged 18/19) in either late 1683 or early 1684.
- Louis III, Prince of Condé (aged 16), was married to his distant cousin Louise Françoise de Bourbon (aged 11) in 1685.
- Philippe, Duke of Chartres (aged 17), married his first cousin Françoise Marie de Bourbon (aged 14), legitimated daughter of Louis XIV, in February 1692.
- Louis, Duke of Burgundy (aged 15), was married to Marie Adélaïde of Savoy (aged 12) in December 1697.

=== 18th century ===
- Philip V of Spain (aged 17) was married to Maria Luisa Gabriela of Savoy (aged 12) in September 1701, five days before Maria Luisa's 13th birthday.
- Louis Armand II, Prince of Conti (aged 17), was married to Louise Élisabeth de Bourbon (aged 19) in July 1713.
- Jules, Prince of Soubise (aged 17), was married to Anne Julie de Melun (aged 15/16) in September 1714.
- Louis, Prince of Asturias (aged 14), was married by proxy to Louise Élisabeth d'Orléans (aged 11) in November 1721.
- Louis XV of France (aged 15) was married to Marie Leszczyńska (aged 22) in 1725.
- José, Prince of Brazil (aged 14), was married to Infanta Mariana Victoria of Spain (aged 10) in January 1729.
- Louis François, Prince of Conti (aged 14), was married to Louise Diane d'Orléans (aged 15) in January 1732.
- Gaston, Count of Marsan (aged 17), was married to Marie Louise de Rohan (aged 16) in June 1736.
- Ercole Rinaldo d'Este (aged 13/14) was married to Maria Teresa Cybo-Malaspina, Duchess of Massa (aged 15/16) in 1741.
- Louis, Dauphin of France (aged 15), was married to Infanta Maria Teresa Rafaela of Spain (aged 18) in 1744. After Maria Teresa's death in early 1746, Louis was required to remarry quickly in order to secure the succession to the French crown. Thus, he married again in February 1747, at the age of 17, to Duchess Maria Josepha of Saxony (aged 15).
- Peter of Holstein-Gottorp (later Peter III of Russia) was 17-years-old when he married his 16-year-old second cousin Princess Sophie of Anhalt-Zerbst (later known as Catherine the Great) in 1745.
- Louis Joseph, Prince of Condé (aged 16), was married to Charlotte de Rohan (aged 15) in 1753.
- Christian VII of Denmark (aged 17) was married to Princess Caroline Matilda of Great Britain (aged 15) in 1766.
- Ferdinand IV & III of Naples and Sicily (aged 17) was married by proxy to Maria Carolina of Austria (aged 15) in April 1768.
- Louis Henri, Duke of Enghien (aged 14), was married to Bathilde d'Orléans (aged 19) in 1770.
- Louis-Auguste, Dauphin of France (aged 15), was married to Archduchess Maria Antonia of Austria (aged 14; later known as Marie Antoinette) in April 1770.
- Louis Stanislas, Count of Provence (aged 15; the future King Louis XVIII of France), was married to Marie Joséphine of Savoy (aged 17) in 1771.
- Charles Philippe, Duke of Artois (aged 16; later Charles X of France), was married to Princess Maria Theresa of Savoy (aged 17) in 1773.
- The future Alexander I of Russia (aged 15) married Princess Louise of Baden (aged 14) in 1793.

=== 19th century ===
- Muhammad Ali Jinnah (aged 16) was married to his first cousin Emibai Jinnah (aged 14 or 15) in 1892.
- Mahatma Gandhi (aged 13) was married to Kasturbai Makhanji Kapadia (aged 14) in May 1883.
- Ferdinand, Prince of Asturias (aged 17; later Ferdinand VII of Spain), was married to his first cousin Princess Maria Antonia of Naples and Sicily (aged 17) in October 1802, about a week before his 18th birthday.
- Tokugawa Iemochi (aged 15) was married to Chikako, Princess Kazu (aged 15), daughter of Emperor Ninkō, in February 1862.

=== 20th century ===
- Chiang Kai-shek (aged 14) married Mao Fumei (aged 19) in 1901.
- Mao Zedong (aged 14) married Luo Yixiu (aged 18) in 1907.
- Nie Rongzhen (aged 15/16) married Long Shengxian (aged 18) in 1915.
- B. R. Ambedkar (aged 15) married Ramabai Bhimrao Ambedkar (aged 9) in 1906.
- Kung Te-cheng (aged 16) married Sun Qifang (aged 17) in 1936.
- Jerry Lee Lewis (aged 16) married Dorothy Barton (aged 16) in February 1952.
- Guo Wengui (aged 15/17) married Yue Qingzhi (aged 14) in 1985.
- Billy Wayne Smith (aged 16) married Anna Nicole Smith (aged 17) in April 1985.
- Francis Stuart (aged 17) married Iseult Gonne (aged 25) in April 1920

=== 21st century ===
- Adam Kadyrov (aged 17) married Medni in July 2025
- Taran Noah Smith (aged 17) married Heidi van Pelt in 2001

== See also ==
- List of child brides
- Teen marriage
