= List of child brides =

This is a list of child brides, women of historical significance who married under 18 years of age.

== East & South Asia ==
=== 8th century ===
- Asukabe-hime (aged 16) was married to the future Emperor Shōmu (aged about 16) in c. 717.

=== 9th century ===
- Princess Seishi (aged 16/17) was married to the future Emperor Junna (aged about 41) in 827.

=== 10th century ===
- Fujiwara no Teishi (about 12/13) was married to the future Emperor Ichijō (aged 10) in October 990.

=== 12th century ===
- Princess Yoshiko (aged 17) was married to her nephew, the future Emperor Nijō (aged 15), in March 1159.

=== 16th century ===
- Ruqaiya Sultan Begum married Akbar, her cousin, at the time of his first appointment, at the age of nine, in 1551. Akbar's marriage with Ruqaiya was solemnised near Jalandhar, Punjab, when both of them were 10 years old.

=== 17th century ===
- Tokugawa Masako (aged 12/13) was married to the future Emperor Go-Mizunoo (aged 23/24) in 1620.
- Tamahime (aged 3) was married to Maeda Toshitsune (aged about 7) in 1601.
- Senhime (aged 7) was married to Toyotomi Hideyori (aged 10) in 1603.
- Some of the spouses of the Kangxi Emperor, which included:
  - Empress Xiaochengren (aged 11) who was married to the emperor (aged 11) in 1665.
  - Empress Xiaozhaoren (aged about 12) was married to the emperor (aged about 11) in 1665.
- Some of the spouses of the Yongzheng Emperor, which included:
  - Empress Xiaojingxian (aged 9/10) who was married to the emperor (aged 12/13) in 1691.
  - Empress Xiaoshengxian (aged 13) who was married to the emperor (aged about 26) in 1705.

=== 18th century ===
- Empress Xiaoxianchun (aged 15) was married to the future Qianlong Emperor (aged 15) in 1727.
- Some of the spouses of the Jiaqing Emperor, which included:
  - Empress Xiaoshurui (aged 13) who was married to the future emperor (aged 13) in 1774.
  - Empress Xiaoherui (aged 13/14) who was married to the emperor (aged 29/30) in 1790.
- Princess Thongsuk of Vientiane (aged 14) who was married to the King Rama I (aged 60) in 1798.

=== 19th century ===
- Khair-un-Nissa (aged 14), a Hyderabadi Sayyida noblewoman married James Achilles Kirkpatrick (aged 35/36), an officer of the East India Company in 1800.
- Some of the spouses of the Daoguang Emperor, which included:
  - Empress Xiaomucheng (aged 14/15) who was married to the future emperor (aged 14) in 1796.
  - Empress Xiaoshencheng (aged 16) who was married to the future emperor (aged 26) in 1809.
  - Empress Xiaoquancheng (aged 12/13) who was married to the emperor (aged 38/39) in 1821.
  - Empress Xiaojingcheng (aged 12/13) who was married to the emperor (aged 42/43) in 1825.
- Some of the spouses of the Xianfeng Emperor, which included:
  - Empress Xiaodexian (aged 15/16) who was married to the future emperor (aged 15/16) in 1847.
  - Empress Xiaozhenxian (aged 14/15) who was married to the emperor (aged 20/21) in 1852.
  - Empress Cixi (aged 16) who was married to the emperor (aged 20) in 1852.
- Some of the spouses of the King Rama IV, which included:
  - Queen Somanass Waddhanawathy (aged 17) who was married to the king (aged 47) in 1852.
  - Princess Phannarai (aged 15) who was married to the king (aged 48) in 1853.
- Chikako, Princess Kazu (aged 15), daughter of Emperor Ninkō, was married to Tokugawa Iemochi (aged 15) in February 1862.
- Anandibai Joshi (aged 9) was married to Gopalrao Joshi (aged 27/28) in 1874.
- Rukhmabai (age 11) was married in India to Dadaji Bhikaji (age 19), a cousin of her stepfather, in about 1875. After a lengthy court battle, the marriage was dissolved by an order from Queen Victoria and the publicity helped influence the passage of the Age of Consent Act, 1891, which increased age of consent for girls in India, married or unmarried, from 10 to 12.
- Some of the spouses of the King Rama V, which included:
  - Queen Sunanda Kumariratana (aged 16) who was married to the king (aged 22) in 1876.
  - Queen Savang Vadhana (aged 15) who was married to the king (aged 24) in 1878.
  - Queen Saovabha Phongsri (aged 14) who was married to the king (aged 24) in 1878.
- Mrinalini Devi (aged between 9 and 11) was married to Rabindranath Tagore (aged 22) in 1883.
- Kasturba Gandhi (aged 14) was married to Mahatma Gandhi (aged 13) in May 1883.

=== 20th century ===
- Sadako Kujō (aged 15) married Crown Prince Yoshihito of Japan (aged 20) in May 1900.
- Kaoru Otsuki (aged 15) married Sun Yat-sen (aged 37) in July 1905.
- Ramabai Bhimrao Ambedkar (aged 8) married B. R. Ambedkar (aged 15) in 1906.
- Shigeko, Princess Teru (aged 17), eldest daughter of Emperor Hirohito of Japan, was married to Morihiro Higashikuni (aged 27) in October 1943.
- Janakiammal Iyengar (age 10) was married to the Indian mathematician Srinivasa Ramanujan in 1909.
- Some of the spouses of Puyi, which included:
  - Wanrong (aged 16) who was married to Puyi (aged 16) in 1912.
  - Wenxiu (aged 12) who was married to Puyi (aged 16) in 1912.
  - Tan Yuling (aged 16) who was married to Puyi (aged 31) in 1937.
  - Li Yuqin (aged about 14/15) who was married to Puyi (aged 36/37) in 1943.
- Ushabati Ghosh (age 11) was married to the Indian physicist Satyendra Nath Bose (aged 20) in 1914. Bose, not keen on marriage so early in life and while still attending college, only did so at his mother's insistence. They had nine children, two of whom died in early childhood.
- Liu Chi-chun (aged 16) was married to Yen Chia-kan (aged 19) in 1924.
- Sheikh Fazilatunnesa Mujib (aged 8) was married to Sheikh Mujibur Rahman (aged 18) in 1938.
- Gangubai Kothewali (aged 16) married her suitor, Ramnik Lal (aged 27) in Bombay after eloping from Kathiawad, Gujarat in 1955. Days after her marriage, Gangubai was sold by Ramnik for Rs. 500 to a brothel in Kamathipura where she became a prostitute and later a brothel madame.
- Rowshan Ershad (aged 13) was married to Hussain Muhammad Ershad (aged 26) in 1956.
- Khaleda Zia (aged 15) was married to Ziaur Rahman (aged 24) in 1960.
- Dimple Kapadia (aged 15) was married to Rajesh Khanna (aged 30) in March 1973.
- Sharbat Gula (aged 13) was married to Rahmat Gul (age unknown) in c. 1985.

=== 21st century ===
- Jovie Albao (aged 16) married musician Freddie Aguilar (aged 60) in 2013.

== Europe ==
From 380 A.D. to 1917 A.D. the minimum marriageable age was 12 years for females and 14 years for males in the Roman Catholic Church, which was adopted into canon law from Roman law.

During the Holy Roman Empire (9th–19th centuries), the minimum marriageable age was 12 years for females and 14 years for males. There were some fathers who arranged marriages for a son or a daughter before he or she reached the age of maturity. Consummation would not take place until the age of maturity. Roman Catholic canon law defines a marriage as consummated when the "spouses have performed between themselves in a human fashion a conjugal act which is suitable in itself for the procreation of offspring, to which marriage is ordered by its nature and by which the spouses become one flesh."

In England and Wales, the Marriage Act 1753 required a marriage to be covered by a license (requiring parental consent for those under 12) or the publication of banns (which parents of those under 12 could forbid). The Church of England dictated that both the bride and groom must be at least 12 years of age to marry without the consent of their families; in the certificates, the most common age for the brides is 12 years. For the grooms 14 years was the most common age, with average ages of 14 years for the brides and 17 for the grooms. While European noblewomen often married early, they were a small minority of the population, and the marriage certificates from Canterbury show that, in England, even among nobility it was very rare to marry women off at very early ages.

In England, the minimum marriageable age was raised to 16 in 1929. In 1971, the age of majority was raised to 18 years old.

=== 8th century ===
- Hildegard (aged about 13/14) was married to Charlemagne in 772.

=== 9th century ===
- Æthelswith (aged about 14/15) was married to Burgred of Mercia in 853.
- Judith of Flanders (aged about 12/13) was married to Æthelwulf, King of Wessex (aged about 61), in October 856. After Æthelwulf's death in January 858, Judith (now about 14/15) was remarried later that year to the new king, her stepson Æthelbald. Her second husband died in 860, and she was married to Margrave Baldwin I of Flanders, in either 861 or 862, when she was around 17–19 years old.
- Beatrice of Vermandois (aged about 10) was married to Robert, Margrave of Neustria (aged about 24; later King of West Francia), in c. 890

=== 10th century ===
- Gisela of France (aged about 5) was married to the much older Rollo in 911.
- Eadgifu of Wessex (aged 16/17) was married to Charles the Simple, King of West Francia (aged about 40), in 919.
- Bertha of Swabia (aged about 15) was married to Rudolph II of Burgundy (aged about 42) in 922.
- Adelaide of Italy (aged about 15) was married to Lothair II of Italy (aged 19–20) in 947.
- Liutgard of Saxony (aged 14/15) was married to Conrad, Duke of Lorraine (aged about 25), in 947.
- Adelaide-Blanche of Anjou (aged about 15) was married to the much older Stephen, Viscount of Gévaudan, in circa 955.
- Emma of Italy (aged about 17) was married to Lothair of France (aged 23/24) in 965.
- Theophanu (aged about 17) was married to the future Otto II, Holy Roman Emperor (aged 16/17), in 972.
- Gerberga of Burgundy was about 12/13 when she was married to Herman I, Count of Werl, in circa 978.
- Gisela of Hungary (aged about 11) was married to Stephen I of Hungary (aged about 21) in 996.

=== 11th century ===
- Hedwig of France (aged about 13) was married to Renauld I, Count of Nevers, in 1016.
- Adela of Normandy married the future Stephen, Count of Blois (aged around 35–38), between 1080 and 1083, around the time of her 15th birthday.
- Gisela of Burgundy (aged 14/15) was married to Humbert II, Count of Savoy (aged 24/25), in 1090.
- Constance of France (aged between about 15 and 17) was married to Hugh I, Count of Troyes (aged between about 19 and 21), between 1093 and 1095.

=== 12th century ===
- Cecile of France (aged 8/9) was married to Prince Tancred of Galilee (aged 30/31), in late 1106. As he was dying in 1112, Tancred made Pons, Count of Tripoli, promise to marry her; Pons and Cecile were married later that year, when she was 14/15 and he was 13/14.
- Sybilla of Normandy (aged about 15) was married to Alexander I of Scotland (aged about 29) circa 1107.
- Matilda of England (aged about 12), daughter of Henry I of England, was married to Henry V, Holy Roman Emperor (aged about 28), in 1114. They had been officially betrothed four years prior, in 1110, when Matilda was just eight; and a few months following the betrothal, Matilda was crowned Queen of the Romans.
- Matilda of Anjou (aged about 13) was married to William Adelin (aged 15), son and heir of Henry I of England in 1119.
- Sibylla of Anjou (aged about 11) was married to William Clito (aged 20/21) in 1123. The marriage was annulled the following year on the grounds of consanguinity.
- Eleanor of Aquitaine was about 15 when she married Louis VII of France (aged 17) in 1137; their marriage was annulled in 1152. She went on to marry Henry II of England that same year.
- Petronilla of Aquitaine (aged about 15) was married to Count Ralph I of Vermandois, in 1140.
- Constance of France (aged about 15/16) was married to Count Eustace IV of Boulogne (aged about 12/13), in 1140.
- Agnes of Courtenay was no more than 15-years-old when she was married to Reynald of Marash, sometime before 29 June 1149.
- Sancha of Castile (aged about 14) was married to Sancho VI of Navarre (aged 21) in 1153.
- Constance of Castile (born between 1136 and 1140) was at most 18-years-old when she married Louis VII of France (33/34) in 1154.
- Urraca of Castile was at most 11 years old when she married García Ramírez of Navarre (32) in 1144.
- Theodora Komnene was about 13-years-old when she was married Baldwin III of Jerusalem (aged 27/28) in 1158.
- Elisabeth of Vermandois (aged 16) was married to Count Philip I of Flanders (aged 15/16), in 1159.
- Isabelle de Meulan (aged about 11) was married to Geoffroy, Seigneur de Mayenne (aged 44), in 1161.
- Alix of France (aged about 14) was married to Count Theobald V of Blois (aged 33/34), in 1164.
- Gertrude of Bavaria (aged about 11 or 14) was married to Frederick IV, Duke of Swabia (aged 20/21), in 1166.
- Matilda of England (aged 11), daughter of Henry II of England, was married to Henry the Lion (aged about 37/39) in 1168.
- Clémence de Mayenne (aged 8) was married to Robert IV de Sablé, Grand Master of the Knights Templar (aged 19), in 1169.
- Eleanor of England, daughter of Eleanor of Aquitane and Henry II of England, married 15-year-old Alfonso VIII of Castile in 1170, when she was about 9-years-old.
- Margaret of France (aged 13/14) was married to Henry the Young King (aged 17) in 1172. They had been betrothed since 1160, when Margaret was about 2 and Henry was 5.
- Matilda of Boulogne (aged 9) was married to Duke Henry I of Brabant (aged about 14), in 1179.
- Agnes of France was betrothed at age 8 and is reported to have been 9-years-old when she married Alexios II Komnenos (aged 10) in 1180. She was widowed in 1183 at the age of 12, and was then married to Andronicus Comnenus (aged 65); he died two years later.
- Isabella of Hainault (aged 10) married Philip II of France (aged 14) in 1180. She had previously been betrothed to Henry, future Count of Champagne, when he was 5 and she was only 1.
- Isabella of Jerusalem (aged 10/11) married Humphrey IV of Toron (aged about 17) in 1183. They had been betrothed when Isabella was 8-years-old.
- Berengaria of Castile married Conrad II, Duke of Swabia (aged 13/14), in 1187, when she was about 8-years-old. The marriage was never consummated due to her young age. After Conrad's death in 1196, Berengaria married her first cousin once removed Alfonso IX of León (aged 25/26) in 1197, when she was about 17- or 18-years-old. The marriage was eventually annulled by the Pope in 1204 on the grounds of consanguinity.
- Matilda of Saxony (aged 16/17) was married to Geoffrey III of Perche in 1189.
- Marguerite de Sablé (aged 11) was married to William des Roches (aged 30), in 1190.
- Theresa of Portugal (aged 14) married Alfonso IX of León (aged about 20) in 1191.

=== 13th century ===
- Marie of Ponthieu (aged 9), was married to Simon of Dammartin (aged 27/28) in 1208.
- Marie of France (aged 12/13) was married to Philip I of Namur (aged about 36) in 1211. After his death a year later, she was then married at the age of 14/15 to Henry I of Brabant (aged about 48).
- Beatrice of Hohenstaufen (aged about 11 or 14) was married to Otto IV, Holy Roman Emperor (aged about 34 or 37), in either 1209 or 1212.
- Matilda of Brabant (aged about 12) was married to Henry VI, Count Palatine of the Rhine (aged about 16), in 1212.
- Philippa of Champagne (aged about 17) was married to Erard of Brienne-Ramerupt (aged about 44) in 1214.
- Elizabeth of Hungary was moved to her fiancée's family at age 5 and was married at age 14, in 1221.
- Marie of Brienne (aged about 10) was married to Baldwin II of Constantinople (aged about 17) in 1234.
- Margaret of Provence (aged 12/13) was married to Louis IX of France (aged 20) in 1234.
- Eleanor of Provence (aged 12) was married to Henry III of England (aged 28) in January 1236.
- Joan of Dammartin (aged 16/17) was married to Ferdinand III of Castile (aged 35–38) in 1237.
- Beatrice of Provence (aged about 17) was married to Charles I of Sicily (aged about 20) in 1246.
- Adelaide of Holland (aged about 16) was married to John I of Hainaut (aged 28), in October 1246.
- Violant of Aragon (aged 12) was married to Alfonso X of Castile (aged 27) in January 1249.
- Margaret of England (aged 11) was married to Alexander III of Scotland (aged 10) in December 1251.
- Beatrice of Castile (aged about 11), illegitimate daughter of Alfonso X of Castile and his mistress Mayor Guillén de Guzmán, was married to Afonso III of Portugal (aged 42/43) in 1253.
- Elizabeth the Cuman (aged 8/9) was married to the future Stephen V of Hungary in 1253.
- Eleanor of Castile (aged 12) was married to Prince Edward of England (aged 15) in 1254.
- Beatrice of England (aged 17) was married to John de Dreux (aged 20/21) in January 1260.
- Isabella of Aragon (aged 13/14) was married to the future Philip III of France (aged 17) in May 1262. They had been betrothed since May 1258, when she was 9/10 and he was 13.
- Margaret of France (aged 15/16) was married to John I of Brabant (17/18), in 1270.
- Elizabeth of Sicily (aged 8/9) was married to the future Ladislaus IV of Hungary (aged 7/8) in 1270.
- Isabella of Villehardouin (aged either 8 or 11) was married to Philip of Sicily (aged about 15/16) in May 1271.
- Sybille of Bâgé (aged 16/17) was married to Amadeus V, Count of Savoy (aged 22/23) in 1272.
- María de Molina (aged about 17) was married to the future Sancho IV of Castile (aged 23/24) in 1282.
- Joan I of Navarre (aged 11) was married to the future Philip IV of France (aged 16) in August 1285.
- Judith of Habsburg (aged 13) was married to Wenceslaus II of Bohemia (aged 13) in January 1285.
- Mahaut of Artois (aged about 16/17) was married to Otto IV, Count of Burgundy (aged 37), in 1285.
- Margaret of England (aged 15) was married to John II, Duke of Brabant (aged 14), in 1290. Margaret and John had been betrothed since they were 3 and 2, respectively.
- Margaret of Brabant (aged 15) was married to Henry, Count of Luxembourg (aged about 13/14), in July 1292.
- Elizabeth of Rhuddlan (aged 14) was married to John I, Count of Holland (aged 12/13), in 1297.

=== 14th century ===
- Marie de Namur (aged about 13/14) was married to Henry II, Graf of Vianden in 1335/36.
- Joan de Geneville (aged 15) was married to Roger Mortimer, 1st Earl of March (aged 14), in 1301.
- Joan of Artois (aged 11/12) was married to the future Gaston I, Count of Foix (aged 13/14), in 1301.
- Elizabeth de Burgh (aged about 13) was married to Robert the Bruce (aged about 28) in 1302.
- Margaret of Burgundy (aged about 15) was married to the future Louis X of France (aged 15) in 1305.
- Joan of Valois (aged 10/11) was married to William I, Count of Hainault (aged 17–19) in May 1305.
- Anna Přemyslovna (aged 15/6) was married to Henry of Bohemia (aged about 41) in 1306.
- Joan of Burgundy (aged 14/15) was married to Philip V of France (aged about 13/14) in 1307.
- Blanche of Burgundy (aged about 11/12) was married to the future Charles IV of France (aged 13) in January 1308.
- Isabella of France (aged 12/13) was married to Edward II of England (aged 23) in 1308.
- Elizabeth de Clare (aged about 13) was married to John de Burgh (aged 21/22) in 1308.
- Mahaut of Châtillon (aged 14/15) was married to Charles, Count of Valois (aged 37/38), in 1308.
- Beatrice of Castile (aged 16) was married to Afonso IV of Portugal (aged 18) in September 1309.
- Margaret of Valois (aged about 14/15) was married to Guy I, Count of Blois, in 1310.
- Marie of Évreux (aged 7/8) was married to John III, Duke of Brabant (aged 10/11), in 1311.
- Jeanne de Clisson (aged about 12) was married to Geoffrey de Châteaubriant VIII (aged 19) in 1312.
- Catherine of Valois–Courtenay (aged 10) was married to Philip I, Prince of Taranto (aged 34), in July 1313.
- Elizabeth de Badlesmere (aged 3) was married to Edmund Mortimer (aged about 13/14, possibly younger) in 1316.
- Beatrice of Luxembourg (aged 12/13) was married to Charles I of Hungary (aged 29/30) in November 1318.
- Joan of France (aged 9/10) was married to Odo IV, Duke of Burgundy (aged 22/23), in 1318.
- Katherine Mortimer (aged about 5) was married to Thomas Beauchamp (aged about 6) in 1319.
- Margaret Mortimer (aged about 15) was married to Thomas de Berkeley (between the ages of 23 and 26) in 1319.
- Joan of Valois (aged about 16) was married to Robert III of Artois (aged about 33) circa 1320.
- Margaret of France (aged 9/10) was married to Louis I, Count of Flanders (aged about 15/16), in 1320.
- Isabella of France (aged 10/11) was married to Guigues VIII of Viennois (aged 13/14) in 1323.
- Constanza Manuel of Villena (aged at most 10) was married to Alfonso XI of Castile (aged 13/14) in 1325. The marriage was annulled two years later.
- Philippa of Hainault (aged 12) was married to Edward III of England (aged 15) in 1327.
- Joan of the Tower (aged 7) was married to the future David II of Scotland (aged 4) in 1328.
- Maria of Portugal (aged 14/15), eldest daughter of King Afonso IV of Portugal and his first wife Beatrice of Castile, was married to the Alfonso XI of Castile (aged 16/17) in 1328.
- Agnes Mortimer (aged about 11/12) was married to Laurence Hastings, 1st Earl of Pembroke (aged about 9/10), in 1328 or 1329. Laurence was a ward of Agnes's father, Roger Mortimer, 1st Earl of March.
- Blanche of Valois (aged about 12/13) was married to Charles IV, King of Bohemia (aged about 12/13; later Holy Roman Emperor), in 1329.
- Yolande Palaeologina of Montferrat (aged 11) was married to Aymon, Count of Savoy (aged 38), in May 1330.
- Bonne of Luxembourg (aged 17) was married to John, Duke of Normandy (aged 13), in July 1332.
- Eleanor of Woodstock (aged 13) was married to Reginald II, Duke of Guelders (aged about 37), in 1332.
- The future Joanna I of Naples (aged about 6/7) was married to Andrew of Hungary (aged 6) in 1333.
- Joanna of Brabant (aged 11/12) was married to William IV, Count of Holland (aged 10/11), in 1334.
- Beatrice of Bourbon (aged 14) was married to her second cousin John of Bohemia (aged 38) in December 1334.
- Joan I, Countess of Auvergne (aged about 11/12), was married to Philip of Burgundy (aged about 14/15) circa 1338.
- Maria of Navarre (aged 8/9) was married to Peter IV of Aragon (aged 18) in July 1338.
- Joan of Kent (aged 12) secretly married Thomas Holland, 1st Earl of Kent (aged 26), in 1340. Holland went to war overseas, and her family arranged for the 13-year-old Joan to marry William Montagu (aged 12) in either late 1340 or early 1341. When Holland returned, the marriage was revealed, and Holland petitioned the Pope to have Holland's wife returned to him. Following the ruling in Holland's favor in 1349, Pope Clement VI annulled the marriage to Montagu and ordered Joan and Holland to be married in the Church.
- Isabel de la Cerda (aged about 17) was married to Ruy Pérez Ponce de León in 1346.
- Agnes of Navarre (aged 13/14) was married to Gaston III, Count of Foix (aged 16/17), in 1348.
- Joanna of Bourbon (aged 12) was married to Charles V of France (aged 12) in April 1350.
- Maud de Ufford (born 1345/46) was married to Thomas de Vere, 8th Earl of Oxford (aged about 15), sometime before 10 June 1350, when Maud was about 5-years-old.
- Bianca of Savoy (aged 12/13) was married to Galeazzo II Visconti (aged about 30) in September 1350.
- Anna von Schweidnitz (aged 14) was married to Charles IV, Holy Roman Emperor (aged 37), in 1353. She had originally been betrothed at age 11 to Charles's newborn son and heir, Wencelaus, but after the death of both Wenceslaus and his mother, Charles asked to marry Anna himself.
- The future Margaret III, Countess of Flanders (aged 6/7), was married to Philip I, Duke of Burgundy (aged 10/11), in 1357.
- Elizabeth de Bohun (aged about 9) was married to Richard Fitzalan (aged 12/13) in 1359.
- Margaret of England (aged 12), daughter of Edward III of England, was married to John Hastings, 2nd Earl of Pembroke (aged 11), in 1359.
- Isabella of Valois (aged 11/12) was married to Gian Galeazzo Visconti (aged 8) in October 1360, about a week before Gian's 9th birthday.
- Mary of Waltham (aged 16) was married to John IV, Duke of Brittany (aged 21), in 1361.
- Elisabeth of Bohemia (aged 7/8) was married to Albert III, Duke of Austria (aged 16/17), in 1366.
- Katherine de Roet (aged 16/17) was married to Hugh Ottes Swynford circa 1366. She would go on to become the mistress and later wife of John of Gaunt.
- Anne Mauny (aged 13) was married to John Hastings, 2nd Earl of Pembroke (aged 20), in 1368, following the death of his first wife, Margaret, in 1361.
- Elizabeth of Pomerania (aged 15/16) was married to Charles IV, Holy Roman Emperor (aged 47), in 1363.
- Joan Holland (aged 15/16) was married to John IV, Duke of Brittany (aged 26), in 1366.
- Taddea Visconti (aged 15/16) was married to the future Stephen III, Duke of Bavaria (aged 29/30), in 1367.
- Philippa of Clarence (aged 12/13) was married to Edmund Mortimer, 3rd Earl of March (aged 15/16), in 1368.
- Eleanor of Castile (aged about 12) was married to the future Charles III of Navarre (aged 13/14) in May 1375.
- Eleanor de Bohun (aged about 9/10) was married to Thomas of Woodstock, 1st Duke of Gloucester (aged about 20/21), in 1376.
- Philippa de Coucy (aged 9) was married to Robert de Vere (aged 14) in 1376.
- Elizabeth of Lancaster (aged 17), daughter of John of Gaunt, was married to John Hastings, 3rd Earl of Pembroke (aged 8), in 1380. The marriage remained unconsummated due to John's age, and was annulled after Elizabeth became pregnant by John Holland, 1st Duke of Exeter, whom she later married.
- Mary de Bohun (aged about 10/11) was married to Henry Bolingbroke (aged 13; later King Henry IV of England) in 1380.
- Anna of Poland (aged 13/14) was married to William, Count of Celje (aged about 18/19), in 1380.
- Anne of Bohemia (aged 15) was married to Richard II of England (aged 15) in January 1382.
- Margaret of Burgundy (aged 10) was married to the future William II, Duke of Bavaria (aged 19), in April 1385, a week before William's 20th birthday.
- Isabeau of Bavaria (aged about 16) was married to Charles VI of France (aged 16/17) in 1385.
- Joan of Navarre (aged about 17/18) was married to John IV, Duke of Brittany (aged 46/47), in 1386.
- Jadwiga of Poland (aged about 12/13) was married to Władysław II Jagiełło (aged about 24/34) in February 1386.
- Marie of Berry (aged about 11) was married to Louis III de Châtillon in 1386. After Louis's death, she was married to Philip of Artois, Count of Eu (aged 34/35), in 1393 at the age of about 18.
- Joan Holland (aged 13) was married to Edmund of Langley, 1st Duke of York (aged 52), in 1393.
- Joan of France (aged 4/5) was married to the future John V, Duke of Brittany (aged 6/7), in 1396.
- Marie of Brittany (aged 5) was married to John of Perche (aged 10/11) in July 1396.
- Anne of Gloucester (aged about 7) was married to Thomas Stafford, 3rd Earl of Stafford (aged about 22), circa 1390. After Stafford's death, Anne married Edmund Stafford, 5th Earl of Stafford (aged 20) in 1398, when she was 15-years-old.
- Joan Beaufort (aged about 12) was married to Robert Ferrers, 2nd Baron Ferrers of Wem (aged about 18), in 1391/92. Ferrers died circa 1396, and later that same year, the now 17-year-old Joan was married to Ralph Neville, 1st Earl of Westmorland (aged about 32).
- Isabella of Valois (aged 6) married King Richard II of England (aged 29)

=== 15th century ===
- Blanche I of Navarre (aged 14) was married by proxy to Martin I of Sicily (aged about 28) in May 1402. An in-person ceremony was later performed in December of that year.
- Johanna van Polanen (aged 11) was married to Engelbert I of Nassau (aged about 34) on 1 August 1403.
- Beatrice of Navarre (aged 13/14) was married to James II, Count of La Marche (aged 35/36), in 1406.
- Mary of Burgundy (aged 12/13) was married to Adolph, Count of Mark (aged 32), in May 1406.
- Isabella of Valois (aged 6) was married to Richard II of England (aged 29) in October 1396, a little over a week before her seventh birthday. The marriage was never consummated. After Richard's death, Isabella married her cousin Charles I, Duke of Orléans (aged 11), in June 1406, when she was 16.
- Michelle of Valois (aged 14) was married to Philip the Good (aged 12) in June 1409.
- Bonne of Artois (aged 16/17) was married to Philip II, Count of Nevers (aged 23), in 1413.
- Jacqueline of Hainaut (aged 14) was married to John, Duke of Touraine (aged 16), in August 1415. After John's death in 1417, she was married to John IV, Duke of Brabant (aged 14), in March 1418, when she was 16.
- Joan of Valois (aged 14), daughter of Isabella of Valois, married John II, Duke of Alençon (aged 15), in 1424.
- Marie of Armagnac (aged about 17) was married to John II, Duke of Alençon (28), in April 1437.
- Marie of Savoy (ages 16/17) was married to Filippo Maria Visconti (aged 35/36) in 1428.
- Catherine of Cleves (aged 12) was married to Arnold, Duke of Guelders (aged 19), in January 1430.
- Jacquetta of Luxembourg (aged 17) was married to John of Lancaster, 1st Duke of Bedford (aged 43), in April 1433.
- Margaret Stewart (aged 11), daughter of James I of Scotland, was married to Louis, Dauphin of France (aged 12), in June 1436.
- Agnes of Cleves (aged 16/17) was married to Charles, Prince of Viana (aged 18), in 1439.
- Blanche of Navarre (aged 15/16) was married to her cousin Henry IV of Castile (aged 14/15) in 1440.
- Eleanor of Navarre (aged 14/15) was married to Gaston IV, Count of Foix (aged 18/19), in 1441.
- Isabel of Coimbra (aged 15) was married to Afonso V of Portugal (aged 15) in May 1447.
- Mary of Guelders (aged 14/15) was married to James II of Scotland (aged 18) in July 1449.
- Lady Eleanor Talbot (aged 13) was married to Sir Thomas Butler, son of Ralph Boteler, 1st Baron Sudeley, in 1449.
- Margaret Beaufort, (age 7; approximately) was married to John de la Pole (age 7) in 1450 by the arrangement John's father. The marriage was annulled in 1453. She was then married again at age 12 to Edmund Tudor, age 25.
- Charlotte of Savoy (aged between 8 and 10) was married to Louis, Dauphin of France (aged 27), in 1451.
- Elizabeth Woodville (aged about 14) was married to Sir John Grey of Groby (aged about 20), in about 1452. Elizabeth would later become Queen consort of England as the wife of Edward IV. Through her daughter Elizabeth of York, she would eventually become the maternal grandmother of Henry VIII.
- Margaret of Guelders (aged 17) was married to Frederick, Count at Sponheim (aged 36) in August 1454.
- Elizabeth of Nevers (at most 15) was married to John I, Duke of Cleves (aged 36), in April 1455.
- Joan of Portugal (aged 16) was married to Henry IV of Castile (aged 30) in May 1455.
- Margaret of Brittany (aged about 12) was married to Francis of Étampes (aged 22) in 1455.
- Margaret of Denmark (aged 13) was married to James III of Scotland (aged about 17/18) in July 1469.
- Eleanor of Viseu (aged 11) was married to her first cousin John, Prince of Portugal (aged 14) in January 1470.
- Anne of France (aged 12) was married to Peter II, Duke of Bourbon (aged 36), 1473.
- Caterina Sforza was betrothed at age 10 to Girolamo Riario (aged 29/30) in 1473. Some sources state that they married in that year, but that the marriage was not consummated until 1477, when Caterina turned 14, the legal age at the time.
- Joan of France, Duchess of Berry (age 12), was betrothed in a wedding contract at age 8-days-old, she was officially married at the age of twelve in 1476, to her cousin Louis, Duke of Orléans (aged 14).
- Anne de Mowbray, 8th Countess of Norfolk (age 6), was married to Richard of Shrewsbury, 1st Duke of York (age 4), in 1477. She died at age 10 and he, as one of the Princes in the Tower, is believed to have been murdered at age 10.
- Sophia of Poland (aged 14) was married to Frederick I, Margrave of Brandenburg-Ansbach (aged 18), in 1479.
- Clara Gonzaga (aged 17) was married to Gilbert of Bourbon-Montpensier (aged 38/39) in 1482.
- Anne of Brittany (aged 13) was married by proxy to Maximilian I, Holy Roman Emperor (aged 31), in 1490. After Charles VIII of France (aged 21) stormed the city where she was staying, she was married to him in 1491, at the age of 14; her marriage to Maximilian was annulled the following year.
- Margery Wentworth (aged about 16) was married to John Seymour (aged about 20) in 1494. They became the parents of Jane Seymour.
- Catherine of York (aged 16) was married to William Courtenay, 1st Earl of Devon (aged 19/20), in 1495.
- Joanna of Castile (aged 17) was married to Philip of Flanders (aged 18) in October 1496.
- Beatrice de Frangepan (aged 15/16) was married to John Corvinus (aged 22/23) in 1496.
- Margaret of Austria (aged 17) was married to John, Prince of Asturias (aged 18), in April 1497.
- Louise de Bourbon (aged 16/17), was married to Andre III de Chauvigny in 1499.
- Philippa of England (aged 12), was married to Eric of Pomerania in 1406.

=== 16th century ===
- Catherine of Aragon (aged 15), was married to Arthur, Prince of Wales (aged 15), in 1501. She was widowed a few months later and eventually married Arthur's younger brother, Henry, Duke of York (aged 17), a couple of weeks before his 18th birthday.
- Margaret Tudor (aged 13), elder sister of Henry VIII, was married to James IV of Scotland (aged 29) in 1503.
- Suzanne, Duchess of Bourbon (aged 14), was married to Charles, Count of Montpensier (aged 15), in 1505.
- Anne de La Tour d'Auvergne (aged 8/9) was married to her first cousin John Stewart, Duke of Albany (aged about 21 or 24), in July 1505.
- Barbara Zápolya (aged 17) was married to Sigismund I of Poland (aged 45) in 1512.
- Isabella of Austria was married by proxy to Christian II of Denmark (aged 33) in 1514, a week before her 13th birthday. A year later, when Isabella was 14, she was brought to Copenhagen, where the marriage was ratified.
- Diane de Poitiers (aged 15) was married to Louis de Brézé (aged about 54) in 1515.
- Ursula Pole, Baroness Stafford (aged 15), daughter of Margaret Pole, Countess of Salisbury, was married to Henry Stafford, 1st Baron Stafford (aged 17) in February 1518/1519.
- Anne of Bohemia and Hungary (aged 17) was married to Archduke Ferdinand of Austria (aged 18) in May 1521.
- Juliana of Stolberg (aged 16) was married to Philipp II, Count of Hanau-Münzenberg (aged 22) in 1523.
- Mencía de Mendoza (aged 15) was married to Henry III of Nassau-Breda (aged 41) in 1524.
- Hedwig of Münsterberg-Oels (aged 16) was married to Georg, Margrave of Brandenburg-Ansbach (aged 40), in 1525.
- Sibylle of Cleves (aged 15) was married to John Frederick I, Elector of Saxony (aged 23) in February 1527.
- Jane Guildford (aged about 16) was married to John Dudley, 1st Duke of Northumberland (aged 21), in 1525.
- Lady Mary Brandon was at most 17-years-old when she was married to Thomas Stanley, 2nd Baron Monteagle, sometime before 1527.
- Renée of France (aged 17) was married to Ercole II d'Este, Duke of Ferrara (aged 19/20), in 1528.
- Catherine de' Medici (aged 14) was married to Henry, Duke of Orléans (aged 14), in 1533.
- Lady Frances Brandon (aged 15/16) was married to Henry Grey, Marquess of Dorset (aged 15/16), in 1533.
- Catherine Willoughby, 12th Baroness Willoughby de Eresby (aged 14), was married to Charles Brandon, 1st Duke of Suffolk (aged about 49), in 1533.
- Emilie of Saxony (aged 17) was married to George, Margrave of Brandenburg-Ansbach (aged 49), in 1533.
- Catherine Carey (aged about 16), daughter of Anne Boleyn's sister Mary, was married to Sir Francis Knollys (aged about 29) in April 1540.
- Christina of Denmark (aged 11) was married by proxy to Francis II, Duke of Milan (aged 38), in September 1533. They were married in person in May 1534, when she was 12 and he was 39. After her first husband's death in 1535, she was considered as a possible fourth wife for Henry VIII, who at the time was 46, while she was only 16. However, the match was opposed by both Christina and her aunt Mary of Hungary, and so it never materialized. Christina eventually married Francis, Duke of Bar (aged 23), in July 1541, when she was 19.
- Dorothea of Denmark (aged 14) was married to Frederick of the Palatinate (aged 52) in 1535.
- Lady Eleanor Brandon (aged 15/16) was married to Henry Clifford (aged 17/18) in 1535.
- Margaret of Parma (aged 13/14), illegitimate daughter of Charles V, Holy Roman Emperor, was married in 1536 to Alessandro de' Medici, Duke of Florence (aged 25/26; nephew of Pope Clement VII), to whom she had been engaged since she was 5-years-old. After Alessandro's assassination a year later, Margaret (now 15), married Ottavio Farnese, Duke of Parma (aged 14), grandson of Pope Paul III, in November 1538.
- Catherine Howard was about 17-years-old when she was married to Henry VIII of England (aged 49) in 1540.
- Agnes of Hesse (aged 13) was married to Maurice, Duke of Saxony (aged 19), in January 1541.
- Jeanne of Navarre (aged 12) was forced by her uncle Francis I of France to marry William, Duke of Jülich-Cleves-Berg (aged 24; brother of Anne of Cleves, who was at the time Queen consort of England as the fourth wife of Henry VIII), in 1541. The marriage was annulled in 1545.
- Maria Manuela, Princess of Portugal (aged 16), was married to her double first cousin Philip, Prince of Asturias (aged 16; later Philip II of Spain), in 1543.
- Archduchess Maria of Austria (aged 15) was married to William, Duke of Jülich-Cleves-Berg (aged 29), in 1546.
- Anna d'Este (aged 17) was married to Francis, Duke of Aumale (aged 29), in 1548.
- Anne of Denmark (aged 15) married the future Augustus, Elector of Saxony (aged 22) in October 1548.
- Joanna of Austria (aged 16) was married to her double first cousin João Manuel, Prince of Portugal (aged 14), in 1552.
- Lady Jane Grey (aged about 16/17) was married to Lord Guildford Dudley (aged 17/18) in 1553.
- Lady Katherine Grey (aged 12), younger sister of Lady Jane Grey, was married to Henry, Lord Herbert, in 1553. Henry was at most 15-years-old. The marriage was annulled in 1554.
- Lady Margaret Clifford (aged 14/15) was married to Henry Stanley, 4th Earl of Derby (aged 23), in 1555.
- Mary, Queen of Scots (aged 15/16), was married to Francis, Dauphin of France (aged 13/14), in 1558. The pair had been betrothed since Mary was five and Francis was three. Mary had originally been betrothed when she was six months old to the future Edward VI of England, whom she was supposed to marry at the age of ten.
- Lucrezia de' Medici (aged 12) was married to Alfonso II d'Este, Duke of Modena (aged 24), in 1558. As Alfonso was fighting in France at the time, she did not move to his home in Ferrara until two years later. She died at the age of 16, and is believed to have been poisoned by her husband.
- Countess Palatine Elisabeth of Simmern-Sponheim (aged 17) was married to John Frederick II, Duke of Saxony (aged 29), in June 1558.
- Elisabeth of Valois (aged 13/14) was married to Philip II of Spain (aged 31/32) in 1559.
- Claude of France (aged 11), daughter of Henry II of France, was married to Charles III, Duke of Lorraine (aged 15), in 1559.
- Lettice Knollys (aged 17), grandniece of Anne Boleyn and first cousin once-removed of Elizabeth I, married Walter Devereux, Viscount Hereford (aged 18/19), in 1560.
- Bianca Cappello (aged 15) fell in love with Pietro Bonaventuri and, in November 1563, eloped with him to Florence, where they were married.
- Elisabeth of Austria (aged 16) was married to Charles IX of France (aged 20) in 1570.
- Anne Knollys (aged 16), younger sister of Lettice Knollys, was married to Thomas West, 2nd Baron De La Warr (aged about 21), in November 1571.
- Anne Cecil (aged 15) was married to Edward de Vere, 17th Earl of Oxford (aged 21), in December 1571. She had previously been engaged, in 1569, to marry Sir Philip Sidney, who was two years her senior.
- Margherita Farnese (aged 13) was married to Vincenzo Gonzaga (aged 18), the future Duke of Mantua, in March 1581. The marriage was annulled in May 1583 on grounds of non-consummation, Vincenzo claiming Margherita had been unable to do so due to a deformity and Margherita accusing Vincenzo of impotence.
- Anna Juliana Gonzaga (aged 15) was married to her uncle Ferdinand II, Archduke of Austria (aged 52), in 1582.
- Frances Walsingham (aged 16) was married to Sir Philip Sidney (aged 28/29) in 1583.
- Eleanor de' Medici (aged 17) was married to Vincenzo I Gonzaga (aged 21) in April 1584.
- Gunilla Bielke (aged 16) married John III of Sweden (aged 47) in February 1585.
- Catalina Micaela of Spain (aged 17) was married to Charles Emmanuel I, Duke of Savoy (aged 23), in 1585.
- Virginia de' Medici (aged 17) was married to Cesare d'Este, Duke of Modena (aged 23), in 1586.
- Agnes Hedwig of Anhalt (aged 13) married Augustus, Elector of Saxony (aged 59) in January 1586.
- Anne of Denmark (aged 14) married James VI and I (aged 23) in 1589.
- Lady Bridget de Vere (aged 15) was married to Francis Norris (aged 19), in April 1599, a few weeks after her 15th birthday.
- Archduchess Margaret of Austria (aged 14) was married to Philip III of Spain (aged 21), her first-cousin, once-removed, in April 1599.

=== 17th century ===
- Lady Susan de Vere (aged 17) married Sir Philip Herbert (aged 19) in June 1604.
- Alice Barnham (aged 13) married Francis Bacon (aged 45) in May 1606.
- Margherita Gonzaga (aged 14) was married to Henry II, Duke of Lorraine (aged 42), in April 1606.
- Isabella of Savoy (aged 16) was married to Alfonso, Hereditary Prince of Modena (aged 16/17), in 1608.
- Françoise de Lorraine (aged 15/16) was married to César, Duke of Vendôme (aged 14), in July 1608.
- Elizabeth Stuart (aged 16), eldest daughter of James VI and I and Anne of Denmark, married Frederick V of the Palatinate (aged 16), in 1613.
- Lady Dorothy Percy (aged about 17) was married to Robert Sidney (aged 19/20) in 1615.
- Anne of Austria (aged 14) was married to her second cousin Louis XIII of France (aged 14) in November 1615.
- Christine of France (aged 13) was married to Victor Amadeus I, Duke of Savoy (aged 31), in 1619.
- Henrietta Maria of France (aged 15) married Charles I of England (aged 24) in 1625.
- Sophia Eleonore of Saxony (aged 17) was married to George II, Landgrave of Hesse-Darmstadt (aged 21), in April 1627.
- Lady Margaret Sackville (aged 14) was married to John Tufton, 2nd Earl of Thanet (aged 20), in 1629.
- Magdalene Sibylle of Saxony (aged 16) married Christian, Prince-Elect of Denmark (aged 30), in 1634. The couple were engaged in 1633, and the marriage had been discussed as early as 1630.
- Countess Sophie Elisabeth of Schleswig-Holstein (aged 15), daughter of King Christian IV of Denmark and Kirsten Munk, married Christian von Pentz (aged about 34) in 1634.
- Countess Leonora Christina of Schleswig-Holstein (aged 15), daughter of King Christian IV of Denmark and Kirsten Munk, married Corfitz Ulfeldt (aged 30) in 1636.
- Countess Elisabeth Auguste of Schleswig-Holstein (aged 16), daughter of King Christian IV of Denmark and Kirsten Munk, married Hans Lindenov (aged 23) in 1639.
- Claudine Françoise Mignot (aged 16) was married to Pierre de Portes d'Ambérieux in July 1640. She later went on to marry John II Casimir Vasa, former King of Poland.
- Mary, Princess Royal (aged 9), married the future William II, Prince of Orange (aged 15), in 1641. The marriage was reported to not have been consummated for a number of years due to the bride's age.
- Countess Christiane of Schleswig-Holstein (aged 16), daughter of King Christian IV of Denmark and Kirsten Munk, married Hannibal Sehested (aged 33) in 1642.
- Countess Hedwig of Schleswig-Holstein (aged 16), daughter of King Christian IV of Denmark and Kirsten Munk, married Ebbe Ulfeldt in 1642.
- Princess Luisa Cristina of Savoy (aged 13) was married to her paternal uncle Prince Maurice of Savoy (aged 49) in 1642.
- Sophie Amalie of Brunswick-Lüneburg (aged 15) married the future Frederick III of Denmark (aged 33) in 1643.
- Sophia Eleonore of Hesse-Darmstadt (aged 16) was married to William Christoph, Landgrave of Hesse-Homburg (aged 24), in April 1650.
- Maria Elisabeth of Holstein-Gottorp (aged 16) married the future Louis VI, Landgrave of Hesse-Darmstadt (aged 20), in November 1650.
- Princess Henriette Adelaide of Savoy (aged 14) was married to the future Ferdinand Maria, Elector of Bavaria (aged 14), in December 1650.
- Laura Mancini (aged 14), one of the Mazarinettes, was married to Louis, Duke of Vendôme (aged 48), in February 1651.
- Princess Augusta of Schleswig-Holstein-Sonderburg-Glücksburg (aged 17), married her first cousin Ernest Günther, Duke of Schleswig-Holstein-Sonderburg-Augustenburg (aged 43), in June 1651, twelve days shy of her 18th birthday.
- Françoise d'Aubigné (aged 16/17) was married to Paul Scarron (aged 41/42) in 1652. She later went on to marry Louis XIV of France.
- Lady Dorothy Spencer (aged 15/16) was married to George Savile, 1st Viscount Halifax (aged 23), in 1656.
- Mary Scott, 3rd Countess of Buccleuch (aged 11), was married to Walter Scott of Highchester (aged 14) in 1659.
- Jane Needham (aged about 14/15) was married to Charles Myddelton (aged 24/25) in 1660.
- Henrietta of England (aged 16) married Philippe I, Duke of Orléans (aged 20), in 1661.
- Anne Scott, 1st Duchess of Buccleuch (aged 12), was married to James Crofts, 1st Duke of Monmouth (aged 14), illegitimate son of Charles II of England and his mistress Lucy Walter, in April 1663.
- Anne Henriette of Bavaria (aged 15) was married to Henri Jules, Duke of Enghien (aged 20), in December 1663.
- Frances Jennings (aged 16) was married to George Hamilton in 1665.
- Infanta Margaret Theresa of Spain (aged 15) was married to Leopold I, Holy Roman Emperor (aged 26), who was her maternal uncle and paternal first cousin once removed, in December 1666. They had been betrothed since 1663.
- Charlotte Amalie of Hesse-Kassel (aged 17) married the future Christian V of Denmark (aged 21) in 1667.
- Anna Isabella Gonzaga (aged 15/16) was married to Ferdinando Carlo Gonzaga, Duke of Mantua and Montferrat (aged 18/19), in 1671.
- Mary of Modena (aged 15) was married to James II of England (aged 39).
- Christine Wilhelmine of Hesse-Homburg (aged 17) was married to Frederick, Duke of Mecklenburg-Grabow (aged 33), in May 1671.
- Katherine FitzGerald, Viscountess Grandison (aged 12) was married to her cousin John Power (aged 7/8) in May 1673. The marriage was arranged by John's father Richard, and it was annulled in 1677. Katherine then went on to marry Edward Villiers that same year.
- Lady Anne FitzRoy (aged 13), eldest daughter of Barbara Villiers, mistress to Charles II of England, was married to Thomas Lennard, 15th Baron Dacre (aged 20), in 1674. In 1678, at the age of 17, she was abducted from a convent in Paris and seduced by Ralph Montagu.
- The future Mary II of England (aged 15), then known as The Lady Mary, married her first cousin William, Prince of Orange (aged 27) in 1677.
- Lady Charlotte Fitzroy (aged 13) was married to Sir Edward Lee (aged 14) in 1677. They had been betrothed since 1674, before Charlotte's tenth birthday.
- Sarah Jennings (aged 17) secretly married John Churchill (aged 27) in the winter of 1677/78.
- Agafya Grushetskaya (aged 16/17) was married to Feodor III of Russia (aged 19) in July 1680.
- Princess Ludwika Karolina Radziwiłł (aged 13) was married to Margrave Louis of Brandenburg in January 1681.
- Sophia Dorothea of Celle (aged 16) married her cousin George Louis, Electoral Prince of Hanover (aged 22) in 1682. They divorced 1694; he later went on to become George I of Great Britain.
- Henrietta FitzJames (aged 15/16), married Henry Waldegrave, 1st Baron Waldegrave (aged 21/22), in 1683.
- Louise Françoise de Bourbon (aged 11) was married to her distant cousin Louis, Prince of Condé (aged 16), in 1685.
- Henrietta Howard (aged about 17) was married to Henry Horatio O'Brien, Lord Ibrackan, in June 1686.
- Lady Mary Tudor (aged 13), natural daughter of Charles II of England and Moll Davis, was married to Edward Radclyffe, 2nd Earl of Derwentwater (aged 31), in 1687.
- Honora Burke (aged about 14) was married to Patrick Sarsfield (aged about 34) in 1689.
- Countess Palatine Hedwig Elisabeth of Neuburg (aged 17) was married to James Louis Sobieski (aged 23) in February 1691.
- Françoise Marie de Bourbon (aged 14), legitimated daughter of Louis XIV, was married to her first cousin Philippe, Duke of Chartres (aged 17), in February 1692.
- Louise Bénédicte de Bourbon (aged 15) was married to Louis Auguste, Duke of Maine (aged 21), in May 1692.
- Lady Diana de Vere (aged about 15) was married to Charles Beauclerk, 1st Duke of St Albans (aged 23), illegitimate son of Charles II of England and his mistress Nell Gwyn, in 1694.
- Henrietta Crofts (aged about 15) was married to Charles Paulet, 2nd Duke of Bolton (aged about 36), in circa 1697.
- Johanna Elisabeth of Baden-Durlach (aged about 17) was married to Eberhard Louis, Duke of Württemberg (aged about 21), in 1697.
- Marie Adélaïde of Savoy (aged 12) was married to Louis, Duke of Burgundy (aged 15), in December 1697.
- Lady Henrietta Churchill (aged 16) was married to Hon. Francis Godolphin (aged 19), in 1698.
- Princess Johanna Charlotte of Anhalt-Dessau (aged 16) was married to Philip William, Margrave of Brandenburg-Schwedt (aged 29), in January 1699.

=== 18th century ===
- Lady Anne Churchill (aged 16) was married to Charles Spencer, 3rd Earl of Sunderland (aged 24), in 1700.
- Maria Luisa Gabriela of Savoy (aged 12) was married to Philip V of Spain (aged 17) in September 1701, five days before her 13th birthday.
- Henrietta Hobart (aged 16/17) was married to Hon. Charles Howard (aged 20/21) in March 1706.
- Christine Eleonore of Stolberg-Gedern (age 15) was married to Ernst Casimir of Isenburg-Büdingen (age 21), in August 1708.
- Elisabeth Christine of Brunswick-Wolfenbüttel (aged 16) was married to the future Charles VI, Holy Roman Emperor (aged 22), in August 1708, a few weeks before her 17th birthday.
- Marie Louise Élisabeth d'Orléans (aged 14) married Charles, Duke of Berry (aged 23), in 1710.
- Anna of Russia (aged 17) was married to Frederick William, Duke of Courland (aged 18), in November 1710.
- Duchess Charlotte Christine of Brunswick-Wolfenbüttel (aged 17) was married to Alexei Petrovich, Tsarevich of Russia (aged 21), in October 1711.
- Princess Antoinette of Brunswick-Wolfenbüttel (aged 16) was married to her first cousin once removed the future Ferdinand Albert II, Duke of Brunswick-Wolfenbüttel (aged 32), in October 1712.
- Anne Julie de Melun (aged 15/16) was married to Jules, Prince of Soubise (aged 17), in September 1714.
- Frances Thynne (age 16) was married to Algernon Seymour, Earl of Hertford (aged 30), in July 1715.
- Henriette Maria of Brandenburg-Schwedt (age 14) was married to Friedrich Ludwig, Hereditary Prince of Württemberg, (age 17), in December 1716.
- Lady Henrietta Godolphin (aged 15/16) was married to Thomas Pelham-Holles, 1st Duke of Newcastle (aged 23), in 1717.
- Maria Clementina Sobieska (aged 17) married James Francis Edward Stuart (aged 31) in 1719.
- Sarah Cadogan (aged 14) was married to Charles Lennox, Earl of March (aged 18), in December 1719. Lennox later succeeded as the Duke of Richmond, and the couple became the parents of the famous Lennox sisters.
- Louise Élisabeth d'Orléans (aged 11) was married by proxy to Louis, Prince of Asturias (aged 14), in November 1721.
- Grand Duchess Anna Petrovna of Russia (aged 17) was married to Charles Frederick, Duke of Holstein-Gottorp (aged 25), in May 1725.
- Joanna Elisabeth of Holstein-Gottorp, mother of Catherine the Great, was 15 when she married the 36-year-old Christian August, Prince of Anhalt-Zerbst, in 1727.
- Landgravine Caroline of Hesse-Rotenburg (aged 13) was married to Louis Henri, Duke of Bourbon (aged 35), in 1728
- Infanta Mariana Victoria of Spain (aged 10) was married to José, Prince of Brazil (aged 14), in January 1729. She had previously been engaged at the age of 3 to her first cousin the 10-year-old Louis XV of France. She was sent to France, where she remained until the age of 7, when Louis reached his majority and rejected her as a bride.
- Barbara of Portugal (aged 17) was married to the future Ferdinand VI of Spain (aged 15), in January 1729.
- Princess Friederike Luise of Prussia (aged 14) was married to Karl Wilhelm Friedrich, Margrave dari Brandenburg-Ansbach (aged 17), in May 1729.
- Louise Diane d'Orléans (aged 15) was married to Louis François, Prince of Conti (aged 14), in January 1732.
- Elisabeth Christine of Brunswick-Wolfenbüttel-Bevern (aged 17) was married to Frederick, Crown Prince of Prussia (later Frederick the Great, aged 21), in June 1733.
- Princess Sophia Dorothea of Prussia (aged 15) was married to Frederick William, Margrave of Brandenburg-Schwedt (aged 33), in November 1734, a week before Frederick William's 34th birthday.
- Princess Augusta of Saxe-Gotha (aged 16) was married to Frederick, Prince of Wales (aged 29), in 1736. They became the parents of George III of the United Kingdom.
- Marie Louise de Rohan (aged 16) was married to Gaston, Count of Marsan (aged 17), in June 1736.
- Princess Mary of Great Britain (aged 17) married Landgrave Frederick of Hesse-Kassel (aged 19; later Frederick II, Landgrave of Hesse-Kassel) in 1740.
- Jemima Campbell (aged 16) was married to Hon. Philip Yorke (aged 20) in 1740.
- Lady Mary Godolphin (aged 16/17) was married to Thomas Osborne, 4th Duke of Leeds (aged 26), in June 1740.
- Maria Teresa Cybo-Malaspina, Duchess of Massa (aged 9), was married by proxy to Prince Eugenio of Savoy, Count of Soissons (aged 20), in November 1734. However, since he died thirteen days later, they never met and the marriage was annulled on the grounds that it was never consummated. Some years later, in 1741, Maria Teresa, now 15/16-years-old, was married to Ercole Rinaldo d'Este (aged 13/14).
- Princess Sophie of Anhalt-Zerbst (later known as Catherine the Great) was 16-years-old when she married her 17-year-old second cousin Peter of Holstein-Gottorp (later Peter III of Russia) in 1745.
- Duchess Maria Josepha of Saxony (aged 15) was married to Louis, Dauphin of France (aged 17), in February 1747.
- Lady Emily Lennox (aged 15) was married to James FitzGerald, 20th Earl of Kildare (aged 24), in 1747.
- Lady Charlotte Boyle (aged 16) was married to William Cavendish, Marquess of Hartington (aged 27), in March 1748.
- Barbara Herbert (aged 15) was married to Henry Herbert, 1st Earl of Powis (aged about 47), in March 1751.
- Charlotte de Rohan (aged 15) was married to Louis Joseph, Prince of Condé (aged 16), in 1753.
- Princess Friederike of Brandenburg-Schwedt (aged 16) was married to Frederick II Eugene, Duke of Württemberg (aged 21) in November 1753.
- Drude Cathrine Haar (aged 15) was married to Ludvig Daae (aged 31) in June 1754.
- Lady Louisa Lennox (aged 15) was married to Thomas Conolly (aged 19/20) in 1758.
- Princess Carolina of Orange-Nassau (aged 17) was married to Charles Christian, Prince of Nassau-Weilburg (aged 25), in 1760.
- Charlotte of Mecklenburg-Strelitz (aged 17) was married to George III of the United Kingdom (aged 23) in 1761.
- Lady Sarah Lennox (aged 17) was married to Charles Bunbury (aged 22) in 1762.
- Theodosia Bartow (aged 17) married Jacques Marcus Prevost (aged 27) in 1763. After her husband's death, Theodosia would marry future American Vice President Aaron Burr.
- Princess Wilhelmina Caroline of Denmark (aged 17) married Prince William of Hesse (aged 21; later William I, Elector of Hesse), in 1764.
- Letizia Ramolino (aged 13) was married to Carlo Buonaparte (aged 17) in June 1764.
- Princess Caroline Matilda of Great Britain (aged 15) was married to Christian VII of Denmark (aged 17) in 1766.
- Dorothy Bentinck, Duchess of Portland (aged 16) was married to William Cavendish-Bentinck, 3rd Duke of Portland (aged 28), in November 1766.
- Marie Thérèse Louise of Savoy (aged 17) was married to Louis Alexandre, Prince of Lamballe (aged 19), in January 1767.
- Princess Wilhelmina of Prussia (aged 16) was married to William V, Prince of Orange (aged 19), in 1767.
- Maria Carolina of Austria (aged 15) was married by proxy to Ferdinand IV & III of Naples and Sicily (aged 17) in April 1768.
- Princess Friederike of Hesse-Darmstadt (aged 16) married to Charles of Mecklenburg-Strelitz (aged 26) in September 1768.
- Louise Marie Adélaïde de Bourbon (aged 16) was married to Louis Philippe d'Orléans, Duke of Chartres (aged 22), in 1769.
- Archduchess Maria Antonia of Austria (aged 14; later known as Marie Antoinette) was married to Louis-Auguste, Dauphin of France (aged 15), in April 1770.
- Marie Joséphine of Savoy (aged 17) was married to Louis Stanilas, Count of Provence (the 15-year-old future King Louis XVIII of France), in 1771.
- Charlotte Grenville (aged about 17) was married to Sir Watkin Williams-Wynn, 4th Baronet (aged 22), in December 1771.
- Marie-Anne Paulze Lavoisier (aged 13) married Antoine Lavoisier (aged 28), on 16 December 1771.
- Princess Maria Theresa of Savoy (aged 17) was married to Charles Philippe, Duke of Artois (the 16-year-old future Charles X of France), in 1773.
- Hedvig Elisabeth Charlotte of Holstein-Gottorp (aged 15) was married to her cousin Charles, Duke of Södermanland (the 25-year-old future Charles XIII of Sweden), in 1774.
- Lady Georgiana Cavendish was married to William Cavendish, 5th Duke of Devonshire (aged 25), in 1774, on her 17th birthday.
- Maria Anna of Savoy, Duchess of Chablais (aged 17) was married to her half-uncle Prince Benedetto, Duke of Chablais (aged 33) in March 1775.
- Duchess Sophie Dorothea of Württemberg (aged 16) was married to the future Paul I of Russia (aged 22) in 1776.
- Louise d'Aumont (aged 17) was married to Honoré, Hereditary Prince of Monaco (aged 19), in July 1777.
- Princess Christiane of Saxe-Hildburghausen (aged 16) was married to her uncle Prince Eugene of Saxe-Hildburghausen (aged 47), in 1778.
- Princess Maria Carolina of Savoy (aged 17) was married to Anthony, Electoral Prince of Saxony (aged 25), in 1781.
- Marie Thérèse de Choiseul (aged 14/15) was married to Prince Joseph of Monaco (aged 18) in 1782.
- Infanta Mariana Vitória of Braganza (aged 16) was married to Infante Gabriel of Spain (aged 32) in April 1785.
- Duchess Charlotte Georgine of Mecklenburg-Strelitz (aged 15) was married to Frederick, Duke of Saxe-Altenburg (aged 22), in September 1785.
- Elizabeth Fox (aged 14/15) married Sir Godfrey Webster, 4th Baronet (aged 38/39), in 1786.
- Maria Stella Chiappini (aged 13) was married to Thomas Wynn, 1st Baron Newborough (aged 49/50), in 1786.
- Maria Theresa of Austria-Este (aged 15) was married to Victor Emmanuel, Duke of Aosta (aged 29), in April 1789.
- Duchess Therese of Mecklenburg-Strelitz (aged 16) was married to Karl Alexander, Hereditary Prince of Thurn and Taxis (aged 18), in May 1789.
- Wilhelmine of Prussia (aged 16) was married to her cousin the future William I of the Netherlands (aged 19) in 1791.
- Princess Louise of Baden (aged 14) married the future Alexander I of Russia (aged 15) in 1793.
- Princess Amelia of Nassau-Weilburg (aged 17) was married to Victor II, Prince of Anhalt-Bernburg-Schaumburg-Hoym (aged 25), in 1793.
- Duchess Frederica of Mecklenburg-Strelitz (aged 15) was married to Prince Louis Charles of Prussia (aged 20) in December 1793.
- Princess Juliane of Saxe-Coburg-Saalfeld (aged 14) was married to Grand Duke Konstantin Pavlovich of Russia (aged 16) in February 1796.
- Princess Henriette of Nassau-Weilburg (aged 16) was married to Duke Louis of Württemberg (aged 40) in January 1797.
- Pauline Bonaparte (aged 16) was married to Charles Leclerc (aged 25) in June 1797.
- Frederica of Baden (aged 16) married King Gustav IV Adolf of Sweden (aged 18) in 1797.
- Grand Duchess Alexandra Pavlovna of Russia (aged 16) married Archduke Joseph, Palatine of Hungary (aged 23), in 1799.
- Grand Duchess Elena Pavlovna of Russia (aged 14) was married to Frederick Louis, Hereditary Grand Duke of Mecklenburg-Schwerin (aged 21), in October 1799.

=== 19th century ===
- Caroline Bonaparte (aged 17) was married to Joachim Murat (aged 32) in January 1800.
- Lady Georgiana Cavendish (aged 17) was married to George Howard, Viscount Morpeth (aged 27), in 1801.
- María Isabella of Spain (aged 13) was married to Francis I of the Two Sicilies (aged 25) in 1802.
- Princess Maria Antonia of Naples and Sicily (aged 17) was married to her first cousin Ferdinand, Prince of Asturias (aged 17), in October 1802, about a week before Ferdinand's 18th birthday.
- Princess Victoria of Saxe-Coburg-Saalfeld (aged 17) was married in 1803 to Emich Carl, 2nd Prince of Leiningen (aged 40), whose first wife had been Victoria's aunt. After Emich Carl's death, Victoria went on to marry Prince Edward, Duke of Kent and Strathearn, and became the mother of Queen Victoria.
- Princess Augusta of Bavaria (aged 17) was married to Eugène de Beauharnais (aged 24) in 1806.
- Harriet Westbrook (aged 16) married Percy Bysshe Shelley (aged 19) in August 1811.
- Elizabeth Sackville (aged 17) was married to George Sackville-West, 5th Earl De La Warr (aged 21), in 1813.
- Jane Cleveland (aged 15/16) married John Edward Johnson in 1814.
- Princess Henrietta of Nassau-Weilburg (aged 17) was married to Archduke Charles of Austria (aged 44) in September 1815, about a month before her 18th birthday.
- Princess Marie-Caroline of Bourbon-Two Sicilies (aged 17) was married to Charles Ferdinand, Duke of Berry (aged 38), in 1816.
- Princess Louise of Saxe-Gotha-Altenburg (aged 16) married Ernst III, Duke of Saxe-Coburg-Saalfeld (aged 33; later Ernst I, Duke of Saxe-Coburg and Gotha), in 1817. They divorced in 1826 and were the parents of Albert, Prince Consort.
- Princess Adelheid of Anhalt-Bernburg-Schaumburg-Hoym (aged 17) married Duke Paul Frederick Augustus of Oldenburg (aged 34) in July 1817.
- Duchess Amelia of Württemberg (aged 17) was married to Joseph, Duke of Saxe-Altenburg (aged 27), in 1817.
- Princess Luisa Carlotta of the Two Sicilies (aged 14) was married to her maternal uncle Infante Francisco de Paula of Spain (aged 25) in June 1819.
- Princess Maria Josepha Amalia of Saxony (aged 15) was married to Ferdinand VII of Spain (aged 35) in October 1819.
- Josephine of Leuchtenberg (aged 16) was married to Oscar, Crown Prince of Sweden (aged 23), in 1823.
- Eugénie de Beauharnais (aged 17) was married to Constantine, Prince of Hohenzollern-Hechingen (aged 25), in 1826.
- Princess Augusta of Saxe-Weimar-Eisenach (aged 17) was married to Prince William of Prussia (aged 32) to June 1829.
- Amélie of Leuchtenberg (aged 17) was married to Pedro I of Brazil (aged 30) in 1829.
- Lady Blanche Howard (aged 17) was married to William Cavendish, 2nd Earl of Burlington (aged 21), in August 1829.
- Susan May Williams (aged 17), an American heiress, was married to Jérôme Napoléon Bonaparte (aged 24) in November 1829.
- Persida Nenadović (aged 17) was married to Alexander Karađorđević (aged 23) in 1830.
- Elizabeth Medora Leigh was, as a young teenager, seduced by her brother-in-law, Henry Trevanion, by whom she fell pregnant twice. After the second pregnancy ended in a miscarriage, she eloped with him to France in 1831, at age 16/17.
- Maria II of Portugal (aged 15) was married to Auguste, Duke of Leuchtenberg (aged 23), in 1834. He died two months after the wedding. About a year later, in 1836, Maria married Prince Ferdinand of Saxe-Coburg and Gotha (aged 19), when she was 17.
- Princess Marie of Hesse and by Rhine (aged 16) married the future Alexander II of Russia (aged 22) in 1841, the night before Alexander's 23rd birthday.
- Grand Duchess Elizabeth Mikhailovna of Russia (aged 17) was married to Adolphe of Nassau, Duke of Nassau (aged 26), in January 1844.
- Lady Agnes Hay (aged 16) married James Duff, 5th Earl Fife (aged 31), in 1846.
- Isabella II of Spain (aged 16) was married to her double first cousin Francis, Duke of Cádiz (aged 24), in October 1846. The ceremony was held on Isabella's 16th birthday, and was a double wedding with Isabella's younger sister, Infanta Luisa Fernanda, marrying the Duke of Montpensier.
- Infanta Luisa Fernanda of Spain (aged 14) was married to her first cousin once removed Antoine, Duke of Montpensier (aged 22), in October 1846. The ceremony was a double wedding with her elder sister, Isabella II of Spain, marrying the Duke of Cádiz.
- Princess Alexandra of Saxe-Altenburg (aged 17) married Grand Duke Konstantin Nikolayevich of Russia (aged 20) in 1848.
- Princess Adelheid-Marie of Anhalt-Dessau (aged 17) was married to Adolphe of Nassau, Duke of Nassau (aged 33) in April 1851.
- Empress Elisabeth of Austria (aged 16) married Franz Joseph I of Austria (aged 23) in April 1854.
- Princess Maria Anna of Anhalt-Dessau (aged 17) was married to her second cousin Prince Friedrich Karl of Prussia (aged 26) in November 1854.
- Duchess Alexandra of Oldenburg (aged 17) was married to Grand Duke Nicholas Nikolaevich of Russia (aged 24) in February 1856.
- Princess Louise of Prussia (aged 17) was married to Frederick I, Grand Duke of Baden (aged 30), in September 1856.
- Princess Margaretha of Saxony (aged 16) married her first cousin Archduke Karl Ludwig of Austria (aged 23) in November 1856.
- Princess Cecilie of Baden (aged 17) married Grand Duke Michael Nikolaevich of Russia (aged 24) in 1857, about three weeks before her 18th birthday.
- Princess Charlotte of Belgium (aged 17, later known as Carlota of Mexico) married her 25-year-old second cousin Archduke Maximilian of Austria in 1857.
- Victoria, Princess Royal (aged 17) married to Prince Friedrich Wilhelm of Prussia (aged 27) in Jan 1858
- Princess Maria Clotilde of Savoy (aged 15) was married to Napoléon-Jérôme Bonaparte (aged 36) in January 1859.
- Infanta Maria Anna of Portugal (aged 15) was married to Prince George of Saxony (aged 26) in 1859.
- Milena of Montenegro (aged 13) married the then prince Nicholas I of Montenegro (aged 19) in November 1860.
- Infanta Antónia of Portugal (aged 16) was married to Leopold, Hereditary Prince of Hohenzollern-Sigmaringen (aged 25), in 1861, 10 days before Leopold's 26th birthday.
- Maria Pia of Savoy (aged 14) was married to Luís I of Portugal (aged 23) in October 1862.
- Ellen Terry (aged 16) married George Frederic Watts (aged 46) in February 1864.
- Princess Marie Isabelle of Orléans (aged 15) was married to her cousin Prince Philippe, Count of Paris (aged 25), in May 1864.
- Princess Clotilde of Saxe-Coburg and Gotha (aged 17) was married to Archduke Joseph Karl of Austria (aged 31) in May 1864.
- Grand Duchess Olga Constantinovna of Russia (aged 16) was married to George I of Greece (aged 21) in 1867.
- Infanta Isabella of Spain (aged 16) was married to Prince Gaetan, Count of Girgenti (aged 22), in May 1868.
- Princess Maria Antonietta of Bourbon-Two Sicilies (aged 17) was married to Prince Alfonso, Count of Caserta (age 27), in June 1868.
- Louise of Sweden (aged 17) was married to Frederick, Crown Prince of Denmark (aged 26), in July 1869.
- Archduchess Gisela of Austria (aged 16) was married to Prince Leopold of Bavaria (aged 27) in April 1873.
- Infanta Maria Theresa of Portugal (aged 17) was about a month shy of her 18th birthday when she married Archduke Karl Ludwig of Austria (aged 39) in July 1873.
- Princess Louise of Belgium (aged 16) was a few weeks short of her 17th birthday when she married Prince Philipp of Saxe-Coburg and Gotha (aged 30) in February 1875.
- Mercedes of Orléans (aged 17) was married to her first cousin Alfonso XII of Spain (aged 20) in January 1878.
- Princess Charlotte of Prussia (aged 17) married her second cousin Prince Bernhard of Saxe-Meiningen (aged 26) in February 1878, after a year-long engagement.
- Princess Stéphanie of Belgium (aged 16) was married to Rudolf, Crown Prince of Austria (aged 22), in May 1881, a little over a week before her 17th birthday.
- Kathleen Candy (aged 16/17) was married to Henry Pelham-Clinton, 7th Duke of Newcastle (aged 24/25), in 1889.
- Princess Marie of Edinburgh (aged 17) was married to her distant cousin Ferdinand, Crown Prince of Romania (aged 27), in 1893.
- Princess Victoria Melita of Saxe-Coburg and Gotha (aged 17) was married to Ernest Louis, Grand Duke of Hesse and by Rhine (aged 25), in April 1894.
- Princess Alexandra of Saxe-Coburg and Gotha (aged 17) was married to Ernst, Hereditary Prince of Hohenlohe-Langenburg (aged 32), in 1896.
- Princess Dorothea of Saxe-Coburg and Gotha (aged 17) was married to Ernst Günther II, Duke of Schleswig-Holstein (aged 34), in August 1898, a little over a week before his 35th birthday.

=== 20th century ===
- Princess Sophie of Greece and Denmark (aged 16), sister of Prince Philip, Duke of Edinburgh, married her second cousin once removed Prince Christoph of Hesse (aged 29) in December 1930.
- Beverley Callard (aged 16) married Paul Atkinson in 1974.

== Middle East ==
=== BC: Ancient Egypt ===
- Ankhesenamun (aged about 16) was married to her half-brother Tutankhamun (aged about 10) in about 1332 BC.

=== 7th century ===
- Aisha (aged 6) was married to the Islamic prophet Muhammad (aged about 50) in 620 (with consummation at age 9 or 10).

=== 14th century ===
- Olivera Despina (aged 17) was married to Bayezid I (aged 29) in 1389 or 1390.

=== 18th century ===
- Darejan Dadiani (aged 12) was married to Heraclius II of Georgia (aged 30) in 1750.

=== 19th century ===
Wives of Abdulmejid I

- Servetseza Kadın (aged 16) was married to Abdulmejid I (aged 16) in 1839.
- Düzdidil Kadın (aged 14) was married to Abdulmejid I (aged 16) in 1839.
- Şevkefza Kadın (aged 16) was married to Abdulmejid I (aged 16) in 1839
- Zeynifelek Hanım (aged 15) was married to Abdulmejid I (aged 16) in 1839.
- Gülcemal Kadın (aged 14) was married to Abdulmejid I (aged 17) in 1840.
- Perestu Kadın (aged 14) was married to Abdulmejid I (aged 21) in 1844.
- Mahitab Kadın (aged 15) was married to Abdulmejid I (aged 22) in 1845.
- Nergizev Hanım (aged 17) was married to Abdulmejid I (aged 24) in 1847.
- Serfiraz Hanım (aged 14) was married to Abdulmejid I (aged 28) in 1852.
- Şayeste Hanım (aged 16) was married to Abdulmejid I (aged 29) in 1852.
- Navekmisal Hanım (aged 15) was married to Abdulmejid I (aged 30) in 1853.

Wives of Murad V

- Mevhibe Kadın (aged 13) was married to Murad V (aged 17) in 1857.
- Şayan Kadın (aged 16) was married to Murad V (aged 29) in 1869.
- Resan Hanım (aged 17) was married to Murad V (aged 37) in 1877.
- Filizten Hanım (aged 17) was married to Murad V (aged 39) around 1879.
- Zübeyde Hanım (aged 15) was married to Ali Rıza Efendi (aged 32) in 1871.

=== 20th century ===
- Inşirah Hanım (aged 17) was married to Mehmed VI (aged 44) in 1905.
- Al Jawhara bint Musaed Al Jiluwi (aged 17) was married to Ibn Saud (aged 32/33) in 1908.
- Khadijeh Saqafi (aged 16) was married to Ruhollah Khomeini (aged 27) in 1929.
- Fawzia Fuad of Egypt (aged 17) was married to Mohammad Reza Pahlavi (aged 19) on 15 March 1939.
- Hessa bint Salman Al Khalifa (aged 16) was married to Isa bin Salman Al Khalifa (aged 18) in 1949.
- Gönül Yazar (aged 16) was married to Necdet Yazar in 1952.
- Ateghe Sediqi (aged 15) was married to Mohammad-Ali Rajai (aged 25) in 1956.
- Mansoureh Khojasteh Bagherzadeh (aged 17) was married to Ali Khamenei (aged 25) in 1964.
- Sahebeh Rouhani (aged 14) was married to Hassan Rouhani (aged 20) in 1968.
- Muazzez Ersoy (aged 16) was married in 1974.
- Leyla Zana (aged 14) was married to Mehdi Zana (aged 35) in 1975.
- Hülya Avşar (aged 16) was married to Mehmet Tecirli (age unknown) in 1979.
- Hayrünnisa Gül (aged 15) was married to Abdullah Gül (aged 30) in 1980.
- Hande Yener (aged 17) was married to Uğur Kulaçoğlu (age unknown) in 1990.
- Layal Abboud (aged 16) was married in 1998.

=== 21st century ===
- Nujood Ali (aged 9) married Faez Ali Thamer (aged in his 30s) in 2008. She secured a divorce aged 10 and is an activist against child marriage in Yemen.
- Reem Al Numery (aged 12) married her cousin (aged 30) in 2008. After receiving international attention from 2 suicide attempts, she was granted a divorce by a Yemeni judge in 2010.
- Shamima Begum (aged 15) married Yago Riedijk (aged 23) in 2015. Before her marriage, she left London to join the Islamic State in Syria.

== North & South America ==
=== 17th century ===
- Maria van Cortlandt (aged 16) was married to Jeremias van Rensselaer (aged 30) in July 1662, about a week before Maria's 17th birthday.

=== 18th century ===
- Lawrence Washington (aged 25), half-brother of George Washington, married Anne Fairfax (aged 15), daughter of Colonel William Fairfax, in July 1743.
- Arthur Dobbs (aged 73) married Justina Davis (aged 15) in 1762.
- Elizabeth Kortright (aged 17) married James Monroe (aged 26) in February 1786. Monroe would go on to become the fifth President of the United States.
- Martha Jefferson (aged 17), eldest daughter of Thomas Jefferson, married Thomas Mann Randolph Jr. (aged 21) in February 1790.
- Hannah Tompkins (aged 16) married Daniel D. Tompkins (aged 23) in February 1798. Tompkins later served as Vice President of the United States during Monroe administration.

=== 19th century ===
For the latter half of the 19th century, between 13 and 18% of native-born white female first marriages in the United States were of girls under the age of 18.

- María Guadalupe Cuenca (aged 13/14) married Mariano Moreno in May 1804.
- Zephaniah Kingsley (aged 43), a slave trader and plantation owner, purchased and married a slave named Anta Madjiguène Ndiaye (aged 13) in 1806.
- María de los Remedios de Escalada (aged 14) married José de San Martín in September 1812.
- Catherine Willis Gray (aged 14/15) was married to Atchison Gray (aged 17/18) in 1818. She later went on to marry Prince Achille Murat.
- Elizabeth Oakes Smith (aged 16) was married to Seba Smith (aged 30) in 1823.
- Emily Donelson (aged 17) married her first cousin Andrew Jackson Donelson (aged 25) in September 1824. They were the niece and nephew of future United States President Andrew Jackson.
- Eliza McCardle (aged 16) married Andrew Johnson (aged 18) in May 1827. Johnson later became the seventeenth President of the United States.
- Rachel Parker (aged 14) was married to Luther M. Plummer in 1830.
- A number of the numerous plural wives of Joseph Smith, founder of the Latter Day Saint movement, were under the age of 18. They included:
  - Fanny Alger (aged 16), who was married to Smith sometime during 1833–1835.
  - Sarah Ann Whitney (aged 17), who was married with her parents' consent to Smith in July 1842. Nine months after this, she was married to Joseph C. Kingsbury.
  - Helen Mar Kimball (aged 14), who was sealed in marriage to Joseph Smith (aged 37) in May 1843. Following Smith's death when she was 16, Kimball married Horace Whitney (aged 22) "for time", in February 1846. Whitney was a brother of another of Smith's wives.
- Virginia Eliza Clemm Poe (aged 13) married her first cousin Edgar Allan Poe (aged 27) in September 1837.
- Letitia Tyler (aged 17), daughter of U.S. President John Tyler, married James A. Semple in February 1839.
- Harriet Howe (aged 15/16) married Henry Wilson (aged 28) in October 1840. Wilson later served as Vice President of the United States during the Grant administration.
- Mary Cyrene Burch (aged 17) married John C. Breckinridge (aged 22) in December 1843. Breckinridge later served as Vice President of the United States during the Buchanan administration.
- A number of the numerous plural wives of Brigham Young, the second president of the Church of Jesus Christ of Latter-day Saints, were under the age of 18. They included:
  - Clarissa Caroline Decker (aged 15) who was married to Young in 1844.
  - Elizabeth Fairchild (aged 17) who was married to Young in 1846.
  - Diana Chase (aged 17) who was married to Young in 1844.
  - Ellen Rockwood (aged 16) who was married to Young in 1846.
  - Lucy Bigelow (aged 16) who was married to Young in 1847.
- Mary King (aged about 17) was married to William A. Wheeler (aged 25/26, later VP in the Hayes administration) in 1845.
- Susie Baker (aged about 14) married Edward King in 1862.
- Ysabel del Valle (aged 15) married Ygnacio del Valle (aged 44) in 1852.
- Julina Lambson Smith (aged 16/17) was married to Joseph F. Smith (aged 27/28), nephew of Joseph Smith and sixth president of the Church of Jesus Christ of Latter-day Saints, in 1866.
- Narcissa Florence Foster (aged 15), married Dr. Francis Thornton Jenkins in July 1883.

=== 20th century ===
- Ariel Durant (aged 15) married Will Durant (aged 28) in 1913.
- Gladys Pearl Baker (aged 15) married Jasper Newton Baker (aged 31) in 1917.
- Frances Belle Heenan (aged 15) married New York City real estate developer Edward Browning (aged 51) in April 1926.
- Paulette Goddard (aged 17) married tycoon Edgar James (aged 34) in June 1927.
- Ruchoma Shain (aged 17) married Moshe Shain in 1931.
- Virginia Adele (aged 17) married William Jefferson Blythe Jr. (aged 17) in 1935. They divorced thirteen months later. William later remarried several times throughout his life and was the biological father of American president Bill Clinton.
- Eunice Winstead (aged 9) married Charlie Johns (aged 22) in 1937.
- Lois Andrews (aged 16) married George Jessel (aged 42) in 1940.
- Marilyn Monroe (aged 16) married James Dougherty (aged 21) in June 1942.
- Betsy Blair (aged 17) married Gene Kelly (aged 29) in 1941.
- Janet Leigh (aged 15) married John Carlisle (aged 18) in August 1942.
- Gloria Vanderbilt (aged 17) married Pat DiCicco (aged 32) in December 1941
- Shirley Temple (aged 17) married John Agar (aged 24) in September 1945
- Loretta Webb (aged 15) married Oliver Lynn (aged 21) in January 1948.
- Karen Black (aged 15) married Charles Black in 1954.
- Jill St. John (aged 16) married Neil Dubin (aged 22) in May 1957.
- Myra Brown (aged 13) married Jerry Lee Lewis (aged 22) on December 12, 1957. The marriage was repeated June 4, 1958 because his previous divorce wasn't finalized.
- Lana Wood (aged 16) married Jack Wrather Jr. (aged 18) in December 1962.
- Shirley Anne Milburn (aged 15) married John Peel (aged 25) in 1965.
- Belinda Boyd (aged 17) married Muhammad Ali (aged 25) in 1967.
- Sherry Johnson (aged 11) was compelled by her mother to marry Alfonsa Tolbert (a deacon in their church and the man who had raped and impregnated Sherry) in March 1971.
- Rena Chynoweth (aged 16) was married to Ervil LeBaron (aged about 49) circa 1974. Chynoweth was among at least thirteen plural wives LeBaron married, many of whom were underage at the time of their marriages.
- Xiomara Castro (aged 16) married Manuel Zelaya (aged 23) in January 1976.
- Maria Victoria Henao (aged 15) married Pablo Escobar (aged 26) in March 1976.
- Demi Moore (aged 17) married Freddy Moore (aged 29) in February 1980.
- Anna Nicole Smith (aged 17) married Billy Wayne Smith (aged 16) in April 1985.
- Milla Jovovich (aged 17) married Shawn Andrews (aged 21) in 1992.
- Aaliyah (aged 15) illegally married R. Kelly (aged 27) in 1994.

=== 21st century ===
- Merrianne Jessop (aged 12) was married to Warren Jeffs (aged 50), the president of the Fundamentalist Church of Jesus Christ of Latter-Day Saints, in 2006. She was one of Jeffs many wives, several of whom were underage.
- Courtney Stodden (aged 16) married Doug Hutchison (aged 51) in 2011.

== See also ==
- Child marriage
- Teenage marriage
- List of child bridegrooms
