= Teenage marriage =

Matrimonial union of two adolescents

Women married by age 18

Teenage marriage is the union of two adolescents between the ages of 13 and 19. Many factors contribute to teenage marriage, such as love, teenage pregnancy, religion, security, wealth, family, peer pressure, arranged marriage, economic and/or political reasons, social advancement, and cultural reasons. Studies have shown that teenage married couples are often disadvantaged, may come from broken homes, may have little education, and work in low-status jobs and lead a poor economic life in comparison with those that marry after adolescence.

A majority of teenage marriages may suffer from complications, with many ending in divorce. In the United States, half of teenage marriages dissolve within 15 years of the marriage. The rate of teenage marriage is on a decreasing trend, perhaps due to the many new options that are available to those considering teenage marriage.

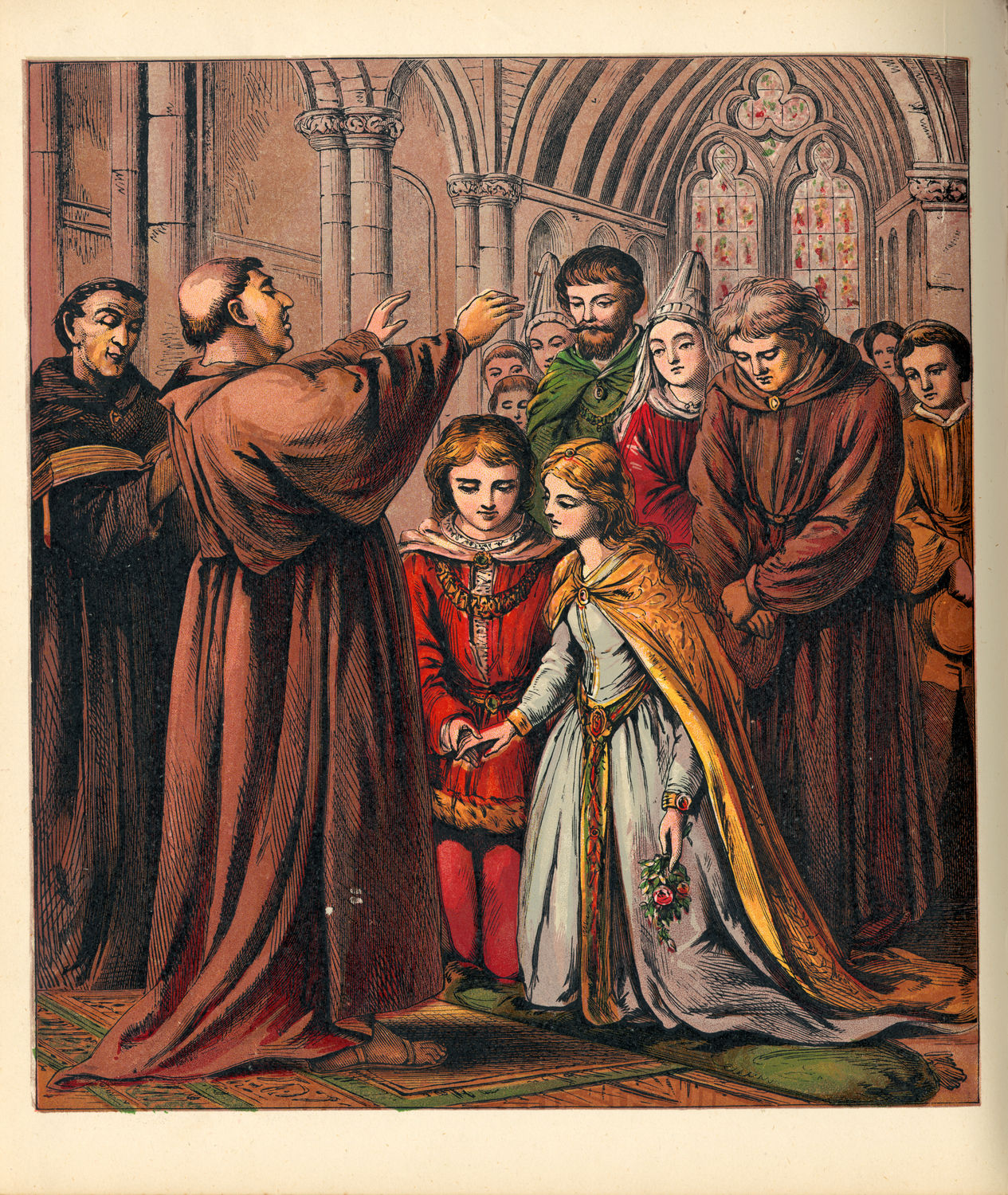
Christian arranged teenage marriage in the Middle Ages

In the 21st century, teenage marriage is largely unrecognized or illegal in most countries, as most laws classify it as child abuse. Teenage marriage continues to be most prevalent in culturally or geographically isolated parts of the world, and it seems to be decreasing in areas where modern ideas of education are prevalent within the population.

== Background ==
The legal status of circumstances surrounding teenage marriage varies from one geographical area or chronological era to the next. Marriage has often been used as a tool to create allegiances or agreements, rather than an emotional union between two people. Almost every country has a legal minimum age for marriage, which can range from 12 in some Latin American countries to 22 in China. The age requirement is most commonly 16 for women and 18 for men. Despite laws concerning the age of marriage, tradition may usually take precedence, and marriage can continue to take place at younger ages. In many African and Asian countries, as many as two-thirds of teenage women are or have been married. In many nations, the marriage of a young daughter could ease a family's economic position, or alleviate concerns over illegitimate children, considered a dishonor to the family in some cultures. However, younger brides can often suffer physical and/or psychological damage, according to a UNICEF report. Historically in Western culture, marriages have been performed at a later age, with an emphasis on the nuclear family. The percentage of women aged 15–19 who are married in the United States is 3.9%, while in the Democratic Republic of the Congo, the percentage is 74%. In the U.S., teenage marriages declined significantly after the mid-20th century but underwent a resurgence in the 1990s, according to the U.S. Census Bureau. Census data from 2000 show that 4.5% of U.S. 15- to 19-year-olds were married, up from 3.4% in 1990. While this was an increase of almost 50%, it was still far below the 9.5% recorded in 1950.

== History ==
=== Pre-20th century ===
==== Asia ====
In ancient China, due to low productivity, low life expectancy and frequent wars, teenage marriage was a very common phenomenon. During Spring and Autumn period, Goujian of Yue ordered forced teenage marriage in order to strengthen the country. Duke Huan of Qi even ordered that all girls over the age of 13 must get married, otherwise they would be punished by the government. Confucius believed that men could get married at the age of 16 and women at the age of 14.

==== United States ====
According to a study of U.S. census data, in 1890 there were 9.7 percent of teen girls and 0.5 percent of teen boys between the ages of 15 and 19 years who had been married at some time.

=== 20th century ===
==== 1940s–1950s ====
- After the Second World War, there was a significant increase in teen marriage. During the 1940s, nearly 12 percent of teenage girls between the ages of 15 and 19 years old had been married. This number increased to over 17 percent by the 1950s.

==== 1960s ====
- More teen girls were getting married than boys. A study found that 32.1 percent of teen girls at ages 18–19 were married while only 8.9 percent of teen boys got married.

==== 1970s ====
- Fewer teenagers got married. Only 11.9 percent of girls and 4.1 percent of boys ages 15–19 got married in 1970.

== Religious aspect ==
The article Religious Heritage and Teenage Marriage suggests that many religions, such as Pentecostalism, Fundamentalist Christianity, and other institutionalized sects, give a message that leads both parents and teens to view early marriage as the only acceptable means of culminating romantic relationships within the religion. It also became a tradition for the first generation.

== US state listing of teen marriage license laws ==
Alabama
- Under-18 applicants need a certified copy of their birth certificate; both parents must be present with identification; or if you have a legal guardian, they must be present with a court order and identification. If one or both parents are deceased, proper evidence of such must be provided.
Alaska
- Under 18 applicants need a certified copy of their birth certificate; both parents must be present with identification; or if you have a legal guardian, they must be present with a court order and identification.
Arizona
- If applicant is under the age of 16, either a notarised parental consent form is needed, or the parents must accompany the applicant, present the proper identification, and sign the parental consent form in front of the clerk issuing the license.
- If applicant is age 16 – 17 one of the following documents showing proof of age is needed:
  - certified copy of birth certificate
  - current driver's license
  - state or military I.D. card
  - or current passport
- If applicant is age 16 or under, a court order is also necessary.
Arkansas
- Under 18 requires consent of both sets of parents.
California
- If either the bride or groom is under 18, at least one of the minor's parents or legal guardian must appear with the couple. Certified copies of birth certificates are required. The couple must also schedule an appointment with a counselor and then appear before a superior court judge.
Colorado
  - If the applicant is 16 or 17, the consent of both parents (or a parent having legal custody), a guardian, or judicial approval is necessary.
  - Before August of 2019, if the applicant is under 16, a judicial court order along with parental consent is necessary.

== Results and consequences ==
=== Consequences ===
According to the book of Eleanor H. Ayer, another situation that could lead teenagers to an early marriage is often unprotected sex, which can lead to pregnancy. Other factors that could also lead to early marriage are love, lust, fear of losing their partner, abuse, extreme parental control, sexual harassment and broader family difficulties.

=== Results ===
One in three teen marriages ends in divorce by the age of 25. Additionally, according to Bob and Sheri Stitof, "marriages and divorce rates have increased by 68 percent since 1995. Also, one out of every four teenagers have parents that are divorced."

== See also ==
- Age of consent
- Child marriage
- List of youngest wives
- Marriageable age
- Teenage pregnancy
