= Gaston, Count of Marsan =

Gaston
- Count of Marsan
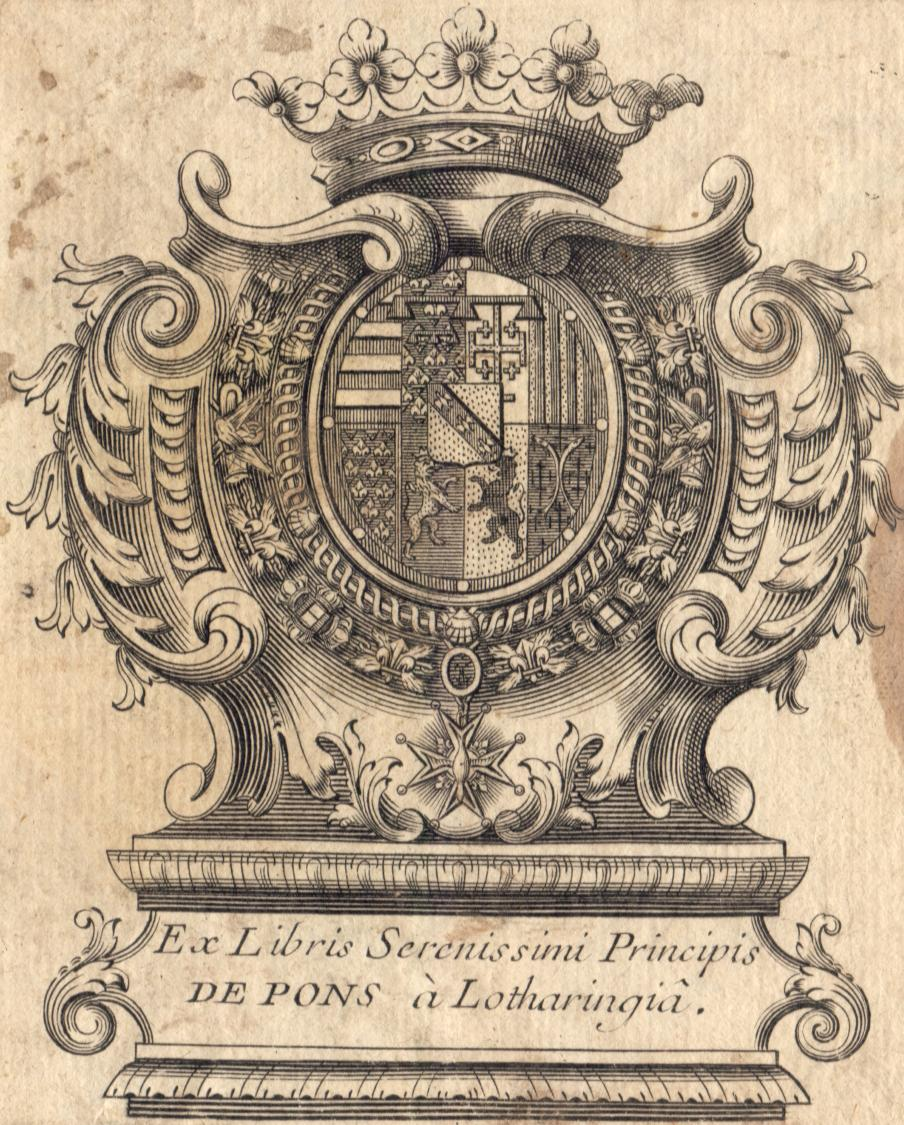
- Born: 7 February 1721; Paris, France
- Died: 2 May 1743 (aged 22); Strasbourg, France
- Spouse: Marie Louise de Rohan
Names
- Gaston Jean Baptiste Charles de Lorraine
- House: House of Guise
- Father: Charles Louis, Count of Marsan
- Mother: Élisabeth de Roquelaure

Gaston de Lorraine (born Gaston Jean Baptiste Charles; 7 February 1721 – 2 May 1743) was a French nobleman and member of a cadet branch of the House of Guise. He was the last Count of Marsan. His wife was Marie Louise de Rohan.

== Biography ==
The eldest son of Prince Charles Louis de Lorraine and his wife, Élisabeth de Roquelaure, he was one of four children. He bore the first names Gaston Jean Bapiste after his great-grandfather Gaston Jean Baptiste de Roquelaure, father of the Maréchal de Roquelaure.

His father was known as the Prince de Pons and Gaston was styled the Count of Marsan (comte de Marsan) from birth. As a male line descendant of the House of Guise (cadet branch of the House of Lorraine) he was a Foreign Prince residing at the royal court of Versailles and had the right to the style of Highness.

His older sister Louise Henriette Gabrielle married into the prestigious House of La Tour d'Auvergne, sovereigns of the Duchy of Bouillon.

At the age fifteen, he was married to Marie Louise de Rohan. Marie Louise was the daughter of Jules, Prince of Soubise and his wife Anne Julie de Melun. The only daughter of five children, her older brother was the Maréchal de Soubise. The couple were married on 4 June 1736. The wedding nuptials were carried out in the chapel of the Hôtel de Mayenne by her great-uncle, the Cardinal de Soubise.

In 1736, the year of his marriage, Gaston was put on campaign as an aide-de-camp to his father. The previous year, he was given his own regiment, the Marsan regiment. On 20 February 1743, he was created a Brigadier of the Kings armies. Some three months later he died of smallpox in Strasbourg leaving his childless wife a widow at the age of twenty two. He was buried in the Strasbourg Cathedral.

His wife never remarried and lived until 1801. She was later the Governess to the Children of France and, as such, the governess of the future Louis XVI, Louis XVIII and Charles X, the grandsons of Louis XV. His wife's parents also died of smallpox within a week of each other in May 1724.
